

13001–13100 

|-bgcolor=#fefefe
| 13001 Woodney || 1981 VL ||  || November 2, 1981 || Anderson Mesa || B. A. Skiff || — || align=right | 3.8 km || 
|-id=002 bgcolor=#fefefe
| 13002 ||  || — || January 30, 1982 || Palomar || S. J. Bus || — || align=right | 5.0 km || 
|-id=003 bgcolor=#E9E9E9
| 13003 Dickbeasley || 1982 FN ||  || March 21, 1982 || Anderson Mesa || E. Bowell || — || align=right | 8.2 km || 
|-id=004 bgcolor=#E9E9E9
| 13004 Aldaz || 1982 RR ||  || September 15, 1982 || Anderson Mesa || E. Bowell || MIT || align=right | 8.3 km || 
|-id=005 bgcolor=#d6d6d6
| 13005 Stankonyukhov ||  ||  || September 18, 1982 || Nauchnij || N. S. Chernykh || — || align=right | 7.9 km || 
|-id=006 bgcolor=#fefefe
| 13006 Schwaar ||  ||  || January 12, 1983 || Anderson Mesa || B. A. Skiff || — || align=right | 5.9 km || 
|-id=007 bgcolor=#E9E9E9
| 13007 || 1984 AU || — || January 8, 1984 || Anderson Mesa || J. Wagner || — || align=right | 6.5 km || 
|-id=008 bgcolor=#fefefe
| 13008 ||  || — || September 22, 1984 || La Silla || H. Debehogne || — || align=right | 4.6 km || 
|-id=009 bgcolor=#E9E9E9
| 13009 Voloshchuk ||  ||  || August 13, 1985 || Nauchnij || N. S. Chernykh || EUN || align=right | 6.3 km || 
|-id=010 bgcolor=#d6d6d6
| 13010 Germantitov ||  ||  || August 29, 1986 || Nauchnij || L. V. Zhuravleva || — || align=right | 18 km || 
|-id=011 bgcolor=#d6d6d6
| 13011 Loeillet ||  ||  || August 26, 1987 || La Silla || E. W. Elst || — || align=right | 10 km || 
|-id=012 bgcolor=#d6d6d6
| 13012 ||  || — || September 30, 1987 || Brorfelde || P. Jensen || — || align=right | 9.1 km || 
|-id=013 bgcolor=#d6d6d6
| 13013 ||  || — || September 16, 1987 || La Silla || H. Debehogne || — || align=right | 10 km || 
|-id=014 bgcolor=#d6d6d6
| 13014 Hasslacher ||  ||  || November 17, 1987 || Anderson Mesa || R. P. Binzel || — || align=right | 14 km || 
|-id=015 bgcolor=#E9E9E9
| 13015 Noradokei || 1987 XC ||  || December 14, 1987 || Geisei || T. Seki || — || align=right | 6.3 km || 
|-id=016 bgcolor=#E9E9E9
| 13016 ||  || — || February 25, 1988 || Siding Spring || R. H. McNaught || EUN || align=right | 3.4 km || 
|-id=017 bgcolor=#E9E9E9
| 13017 Owakenoomi || 1988 FM ||  || March 18, 1988 || Yorii || M. Arai, H. Mori || EUN || align=right | 5.3 km || 
|-id=018 bgcolor=#E9E9E9
| 13018 Geoffjames || 1988 GF ||  || April 10, 1988 || Palomar || E. F. Helin || — || align=right | 8.0 km || 
|-id=019 bgcolor=#E9E9E9
| 13019 || 1988 NW || — || July 10, 1988 || Palomar || E. F. Helin || — || align=right | 6.8 km || 
|-id=020 bgcolor=#d6d6d6
| 13020 ||  || — || August 10, 1988 || Siding Spring || R. H. McNaught || — || align=right | 11 km || 
|-id=021 bgcolor=#d6d6d6
| 13021 ||  || — || September 3, 1988 || La Silla || H. Debehogne || — || align=right | 6.3 km || 
|-id=022 bgcolor=#fefefe
| 13022 ||  || — || September 1, 1988 || La Silla || H. Debehogne || — || align=right | 5.1 km || 
|-id=023 bgcolor=#d6d6d6
| 13023 ||  || — || December 10, 1988 || Chiyoda || T. Kojima || — || align=right | 16 km || 
|-id=024 bgcolor=#fefefe
| 13024 Conradferdinand ||  ||  || January 11, 1989 || Tautenburg Observatory || F. Börngen || V || align=right | 3.2 km || 
|-id=025 bgcolor=#fefefe
| 13025 Zürich || 1989 BA ||  || January 28, 1989 || Zimmerwald || P. Wild || — || align=right | 4.9 km || 
|-id=026 bgcolor=#fefefe
| 13026 || 1989 CX || — || February 7, 1989 || Kushiro || S. Ueda, H. Kaneda || PHO || align=right | 4.5 km || 
|-id=027 bgcolor=#E9E9E9
| 13027 Geeraerts ||  ||  || April 3, 1989 || La Silla || E. W. Elst || — || align=right | 5.0 km || 
|-id=028 bgcolor=#fefefe
| 13028 Klaustschira ||  ||  || April 5, 1989 || La Silla || M. Geffert || — || align=right | 5.3 km || 
|-id=029 bgcolor=#E9E9E9
| 13029 || 1989 HA || — || April 27, 1989 || Brorfelde || P. Jensen || — || align=right | 14 km || 
|-id=030 bgcolor=#E9E9E9
| 13030 || 1989 PF || — || August 9, 1989 || Palomar || J. Alu, E. F. Helin || — || align=right | 7.3 km || 
|-id=031 bgcolor=#E9E9E9
| 13031 Durance ||  ||  || September 26, 1989 || La Silla || E. W. Elst || — || align=right | 6.5 km || 
|-id=032 bgcolor=#E9E9E9
| 13032 Tarn ||  ||  || October 7, 1989 || La Silla || E. W. Elst || — || align=right | 4.5 km || 
|-id=033 bgcolor=#E9E9E9
| 13033 Gardon ||  ||  || October 7, 1989 || La Silla || E. W. Elst || — || align=right | 4.5 km || 
|-id=034 bgcolor=#fefefe
| 13034 || 1989 UN || — || October 23, 1989 || Kani || Y. Mizuno, T. Furuta || — || align=right | 3.5 km || 
|-id=035 bgcolor=#d6d6d6
| 13035 ||  || — || October 30, 1989 || Cerro Tololo || S. J. Bus || SHU3:2 || align=right | 27 km || 
|-id=036 bgcolor=#fefefe
| 13036 ||  || — || December 30, 1989 || Siding Spring || R. H. McNaught || — || align=right | 3.4 km || 
|-id=037 bgcolor=#fefefe
| 13037 Potosi ||  ||  || March 2, 1990 || La Silla || E. W. Elst || — || align=right | 3.2 km || 
|-id=038 bgcolor=#d6d6d6
| 13038 Woolston ||  ||  || March 2, 1990 || La Silla || E. W. Elst || TEL || align=right | 5.4 km || 
|-id=039 bgcolor=#d6d6d6
| 13039 Awashima ||  ||  || March 27, 1990 || Kitami || K. Endate, K. Watanabe || — || align=right | 17 km || 
|-id=040 bgcolor=#E9E9E9
| 13040 ||  || — || July 29, 1990 || Palomar || H. E. Holt || — || align=right | 5.6 km || 
|-id=041 bgcolor=#E9E9E9
| 13041 ||  || — || July 25, 1990 || Palomar || H. E. Holt || MAR || align=right | 6.2 km || 
|-id=042 bgcolor=#E9E9E9
| 13042 || 1990 QE || — || August 18, 1990 || Palomar || E. F. Helin || GER || align=right | 7.4 km || 
|-id=043 bgcolor=#E9E9E9
| 13043 ||  || — || August 24, 1990 || Palomar || H. E. Holt || MAR || align=right | 5.3 km || 
|-id=044 bgcolor=#E9E9E9
| 13044 Wannes ||  ||  || August 16, 1990 || La Silla || E. W. Elst || EUN || align=right | 5.3 km || 
|-id=045 bgcolor=#E9E9E9
| 13045 Vermandere ||  ||  || August 16, 1990 || La Silla || E. W. Elst || — || align=right | 3.1 km || 
|-id=046 bgcolor=#E9E9E9
| 13046 Aliev ||  ||  || August 31, 1990 || Nauchnij || L. V. Zhuravleva || — || align=right | 3.0 km || 
|-id=047 bgcolor=#E9E9E9
| 13047 ||  || — || September 15, 1990 || Palomar || H. E. Holt || — || align=right | 3.3 km || 
|-id=048 bgcolor=#E9E9E9
| 13048 ||  || — || September 13, 1990 || La Silla || H. Debehogne || — || align=right | 8.8 km || 
|-id=049 bgcolor=#E9E9E9
| 13049 Butov ||  ||  || September 15, 1990 || Nauchnij || L. V. Zhuravleva || EUN || align=right | 4.7 km || 
|-id=050 bgcolor=#E9E9E9
| 13050 || 1990 SY || — || September 16, 1990 || Palomar || H. E. Holt || — || align=right | 6.3 km || 
|-id=051 bgcolor=#E9E9E9
| 13051 ||  || — || September 22, 1990 || La Silla || E. W. Elst || — || align=right | 2.9 km || 
|-id=052 bgcolor=#E9E9E9
| 13052 Las Casas ||  ||  || September 22, 1990 || La Silla || E. W. Elst || — || align=right | 6.5 km || 
|-id=053 bgcolor=#E9E9E9
| 13053 Bertrandrussell ||  ||  || September 22, 1990 || La Silla || E. W. Elst || — || align=right | 3.1 km || 
|-id=054 bgcolor=#fefefe
| 13054 ||  || — || September 16, 1990 || Palomar || H. E. Holt || V || align=right | 4.2 km || 
|-id=055 bgcolor=#E9E9E9
| 13055 Kreppein ||  ||  || October 14, 1990 || Tautenburg Observatory || L. D. Schmadel, F. Börngen || EUN || align=right | 4.4 km || 
|-id=056 bgcolor=#E9E9E9
| 13056 ||  || — || November 12, 1990 || Kushiro || S. Ueda, H. Kaneda || — || align=right | 9.3 km || 
|-id=057 bgcolor=#E9E9E9
| 13057 Jorgensen ||  ||  || November 13, 1990 || Palomar || C. S. Shoemaker, D. H. Levy || — || align=right | 8.4 km || 
|-id=058 bgcolor=#fefefe
| 13058 Alfredstevens ||  ||  || November 19, 1990 || La Silla || E. W. Elst || V || align=right | 2.6 km || 
|-id=059 bgcolor=#E9E9E9
| 13059 Ducuroir ||  ||  || January 18, 1991 || Haute-Provence || E. W. Elst || — || align=right | 5.4 km || 
|-id=060 bgcolor=#C2FFFF
| 13060 || 1991 EJ || — || March 10, 1991 || Siding Spring || R. H. McNaught || L4 || align=right | 36 km || 
|-id=061 bgcolor=#E9E9E9
| 13061 ||  || — || March 20, 1991 || La Silla || H. Debehogne || — || align=right | 6.6 km || 
|-id=062 bgcolor=#C2FFFF
| 13062 Podarkes || 1991 HN ||  || April 19, 1991 || Palomar || C. S. Shoemaker, E. M. Shoemaker || L4 || align=right | 29 km || 
|-id=063 bgcolor=#fefefe
| 13063 Purifoy || 1991 LB ||  || June 5, 1991 || Kitt Peak || Spacewatch || FLO || align=right | 3.3 km || 
|-id=064 bgcolor=#fefefe
| 13064 Haemhouts ||  ||  || August 6, 1991 || La Silla || E. W. Elst || V || align=right | 2.2 km || 
|-id=065 bgcolor=#fefefe
| 13065 ||  || — || August 9, 1991 || Palomar || H. E. Holt || — || align=right | 4.2 km || 
|-id=066 bgcolor=#fefefe
| 13066 ||  || — || August 5, 1991 || Palomar || H. E. Holt || — || align=right | 8.6 km || 
|-id=067 bgcolor=#fefefe
| 13067 ||  || — || August 6, 1991 || Palomar || H. E. Holt || FLO || align=right | 2.2 km || 
|-id=068 bgcolor=#fefefe
| 13068 ||  || — || September 4, 1991 || Palomar || E. F. Helin || — || align=right | 3.1 km || 
|-id=069 bgcolor=#fefefe
| 13069 Umbertoeco ||  ||  || September 6, 1991 || Haute-Provence || E. W. Elst || — || align=right | 5.2 km || 
|-id=070 bgcolor=#fefefe
| 13070 Seanconnery ||  ||  || September 8, 1991 || Haute Provence || E. W. Elst || — || align=right | 1.8 km || 
|-id=071 bgcolor=#fefefe
| 13071 ||  || — || September 13, 1991 || Palomar || H. E. Holt || V || align=right | 3.9 km || 
|-id=072 bgcolor=#fefefe
| 13072 ||  || — || September 11, 1991 || Palomar || H. E. Holt || — || align=right | 5.0 km || 
|-id=073 bgcolor=#fefefe
| 13073 ||  || — || September 15, 1991 || Palomar || H. E. Holt || — || align=right | 3.8 km || 
|-id=074 bgcolor=#fefefe
| 13074 ||  || — || September 15, 1991 || Palomar || H. E. Holt || — || align=right | 3.6 km || 
|-id=075 bgcolor=#fefefe
| 13075 ||  || — || October 28, 1991 || Kushiro || S. Ueda, H. Kaneda || V || align=right | 2.9 km || 
|-id=076 bgcolor=#E9E9E9
| 13076 ||  || — || November 11, 1991 || Kushiro || S. Ueda, H. Kaneda || EUN || align=right | 6.0 km || 
|-id=077 bgcolor=#fefefe
| 13077 Edschneider ||  ||  || November 4, 1991 || Kitt Peak || Spacewatch || — || align=right | 3.2 km || 
|-id=078 bgcolor=#E9E9E9
| 13078 || 1991 WD || — || November 17, 1991 || Kiyosato || S. Otomo || — || align=right | 5.1 km || 
|-id=079 bgcolor=#E9E9E9
| 13079 Toots ||  ||  || February 2, 1992 || La Silla || E. W. Elst || — || align=right | 3.9 km || 
|-id=080 bgcolor=#E9E9E9
| 13080 ||  || — || March 2, 1992 || La Silla || UESAC || — || align=right | 6.6 km || 
|-id=081 bgcolor=#E9E9E9
| 13081 ||  || — || March 2, 1992 || La Silla || UESAC || MAR || align=right | 8.9 km || 
|-id=082 bgcolor=#E9E9E9
| 13082 Gutiérrez ||  ||  || March 6, 1992 || La Silla || UESAC || — || align=right | 7.3 km || 
|-id=083 bgcolor=#E9E9E9
| 13083 ||  || — || March 2, 1992 || La Silla || UESAC || — || align=right | 3.9 km || 
|-id=084 bgcolor=#E9E9E9
| 13084 Virchow ||  ||  || April 2, 1992 || Tautenburg Observatory || F. Börngen || — || align=right | 10 km || 
|-id=085 bgcolor=#E9E9E9
| 13085 Borlaug ||  ||  || April 23, 1992 || La Silla || E. W. Elst || — || align=right | 7.7 km || 
|-id=086 bgcolor=#E9E9E9
| 13086 Sauerbruch ||  ||  || April 30, 1992 || Tautenburg Observatory || F. Börngen || DOR || align=right | 11 km || 
|-id=087 bgcolor=#d6d6d6
| 13087 Chastellux ||  ||  || July 30, 1992 || La Silla || E. W. Elst || KOR || align=right | 6.2 km || 
|-id=088 bgcolor=#d6d6d6
| 13088 Filipportera ||  ||  || August 8, 1992 || Caussols || E. W. Elst || — || align=right | 13 km || 
|-id=089 bgcolor=#d6d6d6
| 13089 ||  || — || August 2, 1992 || Palomar || H. E. Holt || — || align=right | 9.0 km || 
|-id=090 bgcolor=#d6d6d6
| 13090 ||  || — || August 6, 1992 || Palomar || H. E. Holt || EOS || align=right | 8.2 km || 
|-id=091 bgcolor=#FA8072
| 13091 ||  || — || August 5, 1992 || Palomar || H. E. Holt || — || align=right | 2.4 km || 
|-id=092 bgcolor=#fefefe
| 13092 Schrödinger ||  ||  || September 24, 1992 || Tautenburg Observatory || F. Börngen, L. D. Schmadel || — || align=right | 2.4 km || 
|-id=093 bgcolor=#d6d6d6
| 13093 Wolfgangpauli ||  ||  || September 21, 1992 || Tautenburg Observatory || F. Börngen || EOS || align=right | 11 km || 
|-id=094 bgcolor=#fefefe
| 13094 Shinshuueda ||  ||  || October 19, 1992 || Kitami || K. Endate, K. Watanabe || — || align=right | 3.3 km || 
|-id=095 bgcolor=#fefefe
| 13095 ||  || — || November 18, 1992 || Kushiro || S. Ueda, H. Kaneda || — || align=right | 3.5 km || 
|-id=096 bgcolor=#d6d6d6
| 13096 Tigris ||  ||  || January 27, 1993 || Caussols || E. W. Elst || 7:4 || align=right | 21 km || 
|-id=097 bgcolor=#fefefe
| 13097 Lamoraal ||  ||  || January 23, 1993 || La Silla || E. W. Elst || — || align=right | 3.0 km || 
|-id=098 bgcolor=#fefefe
| 13098 ||  || — || March 17, 1993 || La Silla || UESAC || — || align=right | 3.5 km || 
|-id=099 bgcolor=#fefefe
| 13099 ||  || — || March 17, 1993 || La Silla || UESAC || NYS || align=right | 3.7 km || 
|-id=100 bgcolor=#fefefe
| 13100 ||  || — || March 17, 1993 || La Silla || UESAC || NYS || align=right | 3.2 km || 
|}

13101–13200 

|-bgcolor=#fefefe
| 13101 Fransson ||  ||  || March 19, 1993 || La Silla || UESAC || — || align=right | 3.5 km || 
|-id=102 bgcolor=#E9E9E9
| 13102 ||  || — || March 17, 1993 || La Silla || UESAC || — || align=right | 4.2 km || 
|-id=103 bgcolor=#fefefe
| 13103 ||  || — || March 17, 1993 || La Silla || UESAC || NYS || align=right | 3.1 km || 
|-id=104 bgcolor=#fefefe
| 13104 ||  || — || March 21, 1993 || La Silla || UESAC || NYS || align=right | 2.0 km || 
|-id=105 bgcolor=#fefefe
| 13105 ||  || — || March 21, 1993 || La Silla || UESAC || — || align=right | 2.1 km || 
|-id=106 bgcolor=#fefefe
| 13106 ||  || — || March 19, 1993 || La Silla || UESAC || V || align=right | 3.2 km || 
|-id=107 bgcolor=#E9E9E9
| 13107 ||  || — || March 19, 1993 || La Silla || UESAC || — || align=right | 5.1 km || 
|-id=108 bgcolor=#E9E9E9
| 13108 ||  || — || March 19, 1993 || La Silla || UESAC || — || align=right | 2.3 km || 
|-id=109 bgcolor=#fefefe
| 13109 Berzelius ||  ||  || May 14, 1993 || La Silla || E. W. Elst || — || align=right | 8.1 km || 
|-id=110 bgcolor=#E9E9E9
| 13110 ||  || — || June 15, 1993 || Siding Spring || R. H. McNaught || EUN || align=right | 4.8 km || 
|-id=111 bgcolor=#fefefe
| 13111 Papacosmas ||  ||  || July 23, 1993 || Palomar || C. S. Shoemaker, D. H. Levy || H || align=right | 2.8 km || 
|-id=112 bgcolor=#d6d6d6
| 13112 Montmorency ||  ||  || August 18, 1993 || Caussols || E. W. Elst || KOR || align=right | 5.1 km || 
|-id=113 bgcolor=#E9E9E9
| 13113 Williamyeats ||  ||  || September 15, 1993 || La Silla || E. W. Elst || — || align=right | 8.7 km || 
|-id=114 bgcolor=#E9E9E9
| 13114 Isabelgodin ||  ||  || September 19, 1993 || Caussols || E. W. Elst || — || align=right | 4.9 km || 
|-id=115 bgcolor=#E9E9E9
| 13115 Jeangodin ||  ||  || September 17, 1993 || La Silla || E. W. Elst || — || align=right | 6.1 km || 
|-id=116 bgcolor=#d6d6d6
| 13116 Hortensia ||  ||  || October 9, 1993 || La Silla || E. W. Elst || EOS || align=right | 8.4 km || 
|-id=117 bgcolor=#d6d6d6
| 13117 Pondicherry ||  ||  || October 9, 1993 || La Silla || E. W. Elst || EOS || align=right | 7.2 km || 
|-id=118 bgcolor=#d6d6d6
| 13118 La Harpe ||  ||  || October 20, 1993 || La Silla || E. W. Elst || EOS || align=right | 9.0 km || 
|-id=119 bgcolor=#d6d6d6
| 13119 ||  || — || November 11, 1993 || Kushiro || S. Ueda, H. Kaneda || — || align=right | 11 km || 
|-id=120 bgcolor=#d6d6d6
| 13120 ||  || — || November 4, 1993 || Siding Spring || R. H. McNaught || — || align=right | 8.2 km || 
|-id=121 bgcolor=#fefefe
| 13121 Tisza ||  ||  || February 7, 1994 || La Silla || E. W. Elst || — || align=right | 2.8 km || 
|-id=122 bgcolor=#fefefe
| 13122 Drava ||  ||  || February 7, 1994 || La Silla || E. W. Elst || V || align=right | 2.2 km || 
|-id=123 bgcolor=#fefefe
| 13123 Tyson || 1994 KA ||  || May 16, 1994 || Palomar || C. S. Shoemaker, D. H. Levy || PHOmoon || align=right | 11 km || 
|-id=124 bgcolor=#fefefe
| 13124 || 1994 PS || — || August 14, 1994 || Oizumi || T. Kobayashi || — || align=right | 9.4 km || 
|-id=125 bgcolor=#E9E9E9
| 13125 Tobolsk ||  ||  || August 10, 1994 || La Silla || E. W. Elst || — || align=right | 9.9 km || 
|-id=126 bgcolor=#E9E9E9
| 13126 Calbuco ||  ||  || August 10, 1994 || La Silla || E. W. Elst || — || align=right | 2.8 km || 
|-id=127 bgcolor=#fefefe
| 13127 Jeroenbrouwers ||  ||  || August 12, 1994 || La Silla || E. W. Elst || MAS || align=right | 2.8 km || 
|-id=128 bgcolor=#fefefe
| 13128 Aleppo ||  ||  || August 12, 1994 || La Silla || E. W. Elst || — || align=right | 3.4 km || 
|-id=129 bgcolor=#E9E9E9
| 13129 Poseidonios ||  ||  || August 12, 1994 || La Silla || E. W. Elst || — || align=right | 6.8 km || 
|-id=130 bgcolor=#fefefe
| 13130 Dylanthomas ||  ||  || August 12, 1994 || La Silla || E. W. Elst || — || align=right | 5.0 km || 
|-id=131 bgcolor=#E9E9E9
| 13131 Palmyra ||  ||  || August 12, 1994 || La Silla || E. W. Elst || — || align=right | 2.9 km || 
|-id=132 bgcolor=#fefefe
| 13132 Ortelius ||  ||  || August 12, 1994 || La Silla || E. W. Elst || V || align=right | 8.2 km || 
|-id=133 bgcolor=#E9E9E9
| 13133 Jandecleir ||  ||  || August 10, 1994 || La Silla || E. W. Elst || — || align=right | 3.8 km || 
|-id=134 bgcolor=#E9E9E9
| 13134 || 1994 QR || — || August 16, 1994 || Oizumi || T. Kobayashi || — || align=right | 3.5 km || 
|-id=135 bgcolor=#E9E9E9
| 13135 || 1994 QX || — || August 31, 1994 || Uenohara || N. Kawasato || MAR || align=right | 5.0 km || 
|-id=136 bgcolor=#E9E9E9
| 13136 ||  || — || October 25, 1994 || Kushiro || S. Ueda, H. Kaneda || — || align=right | 4.4 km || 
|-id=137 bgcolor=#E9E9E9
| 13137 ||  || — || October 26, 1994 || Kushiro || S. Ueda, H. Kaneda || — || align=right | 6.3 km || 
|-id=138 bgcolor=#E9E9E9
| 13138 || 1994 VA || — || November 1, 1994 || Oizumi || T. Kobayashi || — || align=right | 7.1 km || 
|-id=139 bgcolor=#E9E9E9
| 13139 ||  || — || November 3, 1994 || Nachi-Katsuura || Y. Shimizu, T. Urata || — || align=right | 9.3 km || 
|-id=140 bgcolor=#E9E9E9
| 13140 Shinchukai ||  ||  || November 4, 1994 || Kitami || K. Endate, K. Watanabe || — || align=right | 5.8 km || 
|-id=141 bgcolor=#E9E9E9
| 13141 ||  || — || November 30, 1994 || Oizumi || T. Kobayashi || — || align=right | 8.6 km || 
|-id=142 bgcolor=#E9E9E9
| 13142 ||  || — || December 25, 1994 || Kushiro || S. Ueda, H. Kaneda || — || align=right | 4.8 km || 
|-id=143 bgcolor=#E9E9E9
| 13143 || 1995 AF || — || January 2, 1995 || Oizumi || T. Kobayashi || — || align=right | 12 km || 
|-id=144 bgcolor=#d6d6d6
| 13144 || 1995 BJ || — || January 23, 1995 || Oizumi || T. Kobayashi || slow || align=right | 7.8 km || 
|-id=145 bgcolor=#d6d6d6
| 13145 Cavezzo ||  ||  || February 27, 1995 || Cavezzo || Cavezzo Obs. || — || align=right | 8.1 km || 
|-id=146 bgcolor=#d6d6d6
| 13146 Yuriko ||  ||  || February 20, 1995 || Nanyo || T. Okuni || — || align=right | 14 km || 
|-id=147 bgcolor=#d6d6d6
| 13147 Foglia ||  ||  || February 24, 1995 || Cima Ekar || M. Tombelli || KOR || align=right | 6.5 km || 
|-id=148 bgcolor=#E9E9E9
| 13148 || 1995 EF || — || March 1, 1995 || Ojima || T. Niijima, T. Urata || DOR || align=right | 11 km || 
|-id=149 bgcolor=#d6d6d6
| 13149 Heisenberg ||  ||  || March 4, 1995 || Tautenburg Observatory || F. Börngen || THM || align=right | 8.0 km || 
|-id=150 bgcolor=#d6d6d6
| 13150 Paolotesi || 1995 FS ||  || March 23, 1995 || San Marcello || L. Tesi, A. Boattini || TIR || align=right | 11 km || 
|-id=151 bgcolor=#fefefe
| 13151 Polino || 1995 OH ||  || July 22, 1995 || Osservatorio Polino || G. Iatteri || — || align=right | 3.3 km || 
|-id=152 bgcolor=#fefefe
| 13152 || 1995 QK || — || August 19, 1995 || Church Stretton || S. P. Laurie || FLO || align=right | 2.0 km || 
|-id=153 bgcolor=#FA8072
| 13153 ||  || — || August 31, 1995 || Oizumi || T. Kobayashi || — || align=right | 2.4 km || 
|-id=154 bgcolor=#fefefe
| 13154 Petermrva || 1995 RC ||  || September 7, 1995 || Modra || A. Galád, A. Pravda || FLO || align=right | 4.2 km || 
|-id=155 bgcolor=#fefefe
| 13155 ||  || — || September 19, 1995 || Catalina Station || T. B. Spahr || PHO || align=right | 2.9 km || 
|-id=156 bgcolor=#fefefe
| 13156 Mannoucyo ||  ||  || September 20, 1995 || Kitami || K. Endate, K. Watanabe || — || align=right | 3.1 km || 
|-id=157 bgcolor=#fefefe
| 13157 Searfoss ||  ||  || October 15, 1995 || Kitt Peak || Spacewatch || — || align=right | 3.4 km || 
|-id=158 bgcolor=#fefefe
| 13158 || 1995 UE || — || October 17, 1995 || Sormano || P. Sicoli, P. Ghezzi || — || align=right | 3.0 km || 
|-id=159 bgcolor=#fefefe
| 13159 ||  || — || October 20, 1995 || Oizumi || T. Kobayashi || NYS || align=right | 2.3 km || 
|-id=160 bgcolor=#fefefe
| 13160 ||  || — || October 25, 1995 || Oizumi || T. Kobayashi || FLO || align=right | 4.4 km || 
|-id=161 bgcolor=#fefefe
| 13161 ||  || — || October 27, 1995 || Oizumi || T. Kobayashi || NYS || align=right | 3.0 km || 
|-id=162 bgcolor=#fefefe
| 13162 Ryokkochigaku ||  ||  || October 22, 1995 || Nyukasa || M. Hirasawa, S. Suzuki || V || align=right | 3.5 km || 
|-id=163 bgcolor=#fefefe
| 13163 Koyamachuya ||  ||  || October 28, 1995 || Kitami || K. Endate, K. Watanabe || — || align=right | 5.7 km || 
|-id=164 bgcolor=#fefefe
| 13164 || 1995 VF || — || November 1, 1995 || Oizumi || T. Kobayashi || V || align=right | 2.9 km || 
|-id=165 bgcolor=#fefefe
| 13165 ||  || — || November 16, 1995 || Kushiro || S. Ueda, H. Kaneda || — || align=right | 4.3 km || 
|-id=166 bgcolor=#fefefe
| 13166 ||  || — || November 16, 1995 || Kushiro || S. Ueda, H. Kaneda || — || align=right | 7.1 km || 
|-id=167 bgcolor=#E9E9E9
| 13167 ||  || — || November 24, 1995 || Oizumi || T. Kobayashi || — || align=right | 6.0 km || 
|-id=168 bgcolor=#E9E9E9
| 13168 Danoconnell || 1995 XW ||  || December 6, 1995 || Haleakala || AMOS || MAR || align=right | 4.8 km || 
|-id=169 bgcolor=#fefefe
| 13169 ||  || — || December 15, 1995 || Oizumi || T. Kobayashi || NYS || align=right | 3.1 km || 
|-id=170 bgcolor=#fefefe
| 13170 || 1995 YX || — || December 19, 1995 || Oizumi || T. Kobayashi || NYS || align=right | 3.0 km || 
|-id=171 bgcolor=#fefefe
| 13171 || 1996 AA || — || January 1, 1996 || Oizumi || T. Kobayashi || V || align=right | 3.0 km || 
|-id=172 bgcolor=#fefefe
| 13172 || 1996 AO || — || January 11, 1996 || Oizumi || T. Kobayashi || — || align=right | 4.9 km || 
|-id=173 bgcolor=#fefefe
| 13173 ||  || — || January 13, 1996 || Oizumi || T. Kobayashi || NYS || align=right | 2.7 km || 
|-id=174 bgcolor=#E9E9E9
| 13174 Timossi ||  ||  || February 14, 1996 || Cima Ekar || M. Tombelli, U. Munari || MAR || align=right | 6.5 km || 
|-id=175 bgcolor=#E9E9E9
| 13175 ||  || — || March 15, 1996 || Haleakala || NEAT || GEF || align=right | 4.1 km || 
|-id=176 bgcolor=#d6d6d6
| 13176 Kobedaitenken ||  ||  || April 21, 1996 || Yatsuka || R. H. McNaught, H. Abe || — || align=right | 20 km || 
|-id=177 bgcolor=#d6d6d6
| 13177 Hansschmidt ||  ||  || April 17, 1996 || La Silla || E. W. Elst || KOR || align=right | 5.3 km || 
|-id=178 bgcolor=#d6d6d6
| 13178 Catalan ||  ||  || April 18, 1996 || La Silla || E. W. Elst || — || align=right | 9.2 km || 
|-id=179 bgcolor=#d6d6d6
| 13179 Johncochrane ||  ||  || April 18, 1996 || La Silla || E. W. Elst || THM || align=right | 10 km || 
|-id=180 bgcolor=#d6d6d6
| 13180 Fourcroy ||  ||  || April 18, 1996 || La Silla || E. W. Elst || — || align=right | 13 km || 
|-id=181 bgcolor=#C2FFFF
| 13181 Peneleos ||  ||  || September 11, 1996 || La Silla || UDTS || L4 || align=right | 21 km || 
|-id=182 bgcolor=#C2FFFF
| 13182 ||  || — || September 16, 1996 || La Silla || UDTS || L4 || align=right | 31 km || 
|-id=183 bgcolor=#C2FFFF
| 13183 || 1996 TW || — || October 5, 1996 || Sudbury || D. di Cicco || L4 || align=right | 41 km || 
|-id=184 bgcolor=#C2FFFF
| 13184 Augeias ||  ||  || October 4, 1996 || La Silla || E. W. Elst || L4 || align=right | 34 km || 
|-id=185 bgcolor=#C2FFFF
| 13185 Agasthenes ||  ||  || October 5, 1996 || La Silla || E. W. Elst || L4 || align=right | 15 km || 
|-id=186 bgcolor=#fefefe
| 13186 || 1996 UM || — || October 18, 1996 || Catalina Station || C. W. Hergenrother || H || align=right | 2.8 km || 
|-id=187 bgcolor=#fefefe
| 13187 ||  || — || January 6, 1997 || Oizumi || T. Kobayashi || — || align=right | 3.7 km || 
|-id=188 bgcolor=#fefefe
| 13188 Okinawa ||  ||  || January 3, 1997 || Chichibu || N. Satō || — || align=right | 2.5 km || 
|-id=189 bgcolor=#fefefe
| 13189 ||  || — || January 11, 1997 || Oizumi || T. Kobayashi || — || align=right | 4.4 km || 
|-id=190 bgcolor=#fefefe
| 13190 ||  || — || January 29, 1997 || Oizumi || T. Kobayashi || — || align=right | 2.9 km || 
|-id=191 bgcolor=#fefefe
| 13191 ||  || — || January 31, 1997 || Oizumi || T. Kobayashi || V || align=right | 2.7 km || 
|-id=192 bgcolor=#fefefe
| 13192 Quine ||  ||  || January 31, 1997 || Prescott || P. G. Comba || — || align=right | 2.5 km || 
|-id=193 bgcolor=#fefefe
| 13193 || 1997 CW || — || February 1, 1997 || Oizumi || T. Kobayashi || — || align=right | 7.8 km || 
|-id=194 bgcolor=#fefefe
| 13194 ||  || — || February 1, 1997 || Oizumi || T. Kobayashi || — || align=right | 2.6 km || 
|-id=195 bgcolor=#fefefe
| 13195 ||  || — || February 2, 1997 || Xinglong || SCAP || — || align=right | 4.5 km || 
|-id=196 bgcolor=#fefefe
| 13196 Rogerssmith ||  ||  || February 1, 1997 || Kitt Peak || Spacewatch || — || align=right | 4.5 km || 
|-id=197 bgcolor=#fefefe
| 13197 Pontecorvo || 1997 DC ||  || February 17, 1997 || Colleverde || V. S. Casulli || NYS || align=right | 3.3 km || 
|-id=198 bgcolor=#fefefe
| 13198 Banpeiyu || 1997 DT ||  || February 27, 1997 || Kitami || K. Endate, K. Watanabe || — || align=right | 2.2 km || 
|-id=199 bgcolor=#fefefe
| 13199 ||  || — || March 3, 1997 || Nanyo || T. Okuni || — || align=right | 2.4 km || 
|-id=200 bgcolor=#E9E9E9
| 13200 Romagnani ||  ||  || March 13, 1997 || San Marcello || L. Tesi, G. Cattani || KRM || align=right | 2.3 km || 
|}

13201–13300 

|-bgcolor=#fefefe
| 13201 ||  || — || March 10, 1997 || Socorro || LINEAR || — || align=right | 3.0 km || 
|-id=202 bgcolor=#fefefe
| 13202 ||  || — || March 31, 1997 || Socorro || LINEAR || FLO || align=right | 1.8 km || 
|-id=203 bgcolor=#E9E9E9
| 13203 ||  || — || March 31, 1997 || Socorro || LINEAR || — || align=right | 7.1 km || 
|-id=204 bgcolor=#fefefe
| 13204 ||  || — || April 3, 1997 || Socorro || LINEAR || NYS || align=right | 2.7 km || 
|-id=205 bgcolor=#fefefe
| 13205 ||  || — || April 3, 1997 || Socorro || LINEAR || — || align=right | 3.4 km || 
|-id=206 bgcolor=#d6d6d6
| 13206 Baer ||  ||  || April 6, 1997 || Socorro || LINEAR || — || align=right | 3.4 km || 
|-id=207 bgcolor=#fefefe
| 13207 Tamagawa ||  ||  || April 10, 1997 || Kuma Kogen || A. Nakamura || FLO || align=right | 3.2 km || 
|-id=208 bgcolor=#fefefe
| 13208 Fraschetti ||  ||  || April 5, 1997 || Haleakala || NEAT || — || align=right | 4.2 km || 
|-id=209 bgcolor=#fefefe
| 13209 Arnhem ||  ||  || April 9, 1997 || La Silla || E. W. Elst || — || align=right | 3.4 km || 
|-id=210 bgcolor=#E9E9E9
| 13210 ||  || — || April 30, 1997 || Socorro || LINEAR || — || align=right | 4.5 km || 
|-id=211 bgcolor=#d6d6d6
| 13211 Stucky ||  ||  || May 3, 1997 || Kitt Peak || Spacewatch || — || align=right | 4.9 km || 
|-id=212 bgcolor=#fefefe
| 13212 Jayleno ||  ||  || May 3, 1997 || La Silla || E. W. Elst || — || align=right | 3.7 km || 
|-id=213 bgcolor=#fefefe
| 13213 Maclaurin ||  ||  || May 3, 1997 || La Silla || E. W. Elst || NYS || align=right | 3.1 km || 
|-id=214 bgcolor=#fefefe
| 13214 Chirikov ||  ||  || May 3, 1997 || La Silla || E. W. Elst || NYS || align=right | 4.5 km || 
|-id=215 bgcolor=#d6d6d6
| 13215 ||  || — || May 3, 1997 || Xinglong || SCAP || — || align=right | 12 km || 
|-id=216 bgcolor=#E9E9E9
| 13216 ||  || — || June 9, 1997 || Lake Clear || K. A. Williams || MAR || align=right | 4.5 km || 
|-id=217 bgcolor=#fefefe
| 13217 Alpbach ||  ||  || June 30, 1997 || Caussols || ODAS || — || align=right | 5.8 km || 
|-id=218 bgcolor=#E9E9E9
| 13218 ||  || — || June 28, 1997 || Socorro || LINEAR || — || align=right | 3.7 km || 
|-id=219 bgcolor=#d6d6d6
| 13219 Cailletet ||  ||  || June 30, 1997 || Kitt Peak || Spacewatch || — || align=right | 16 km || 
|-id=220 bgcolor=#d6d6d6
| 13220 Kashiwagura ||  ||  || July 1, 1997 || Nanyo || T. Okuni || EOS || align=right | 12 km || 
|-id=221 bgcolor=#E9E9E9
| 13221 Nao || 1997 OY ||  || July 24, 1997 || Kuma Kogen || A. Nakamura || — || align=right | 11 km || 
|-id=222 bgcolor=#E9E9E9
| 13222 Ichikawakazuo ||  ||  || July 27, 1997 || Nanyo || T. Okuni || — || align=right | 12 km || 
|-id=223 bgcolor=#fefefe
| 13223 Cenaceneri ||  ||  || August 13, 1997 || San Marcello || L. Tesi || — || align=right | 2.1 km || 
|-id=224 bgcolor=#d6d6d6
| 13224 Takamatsuda ||  ||  || August 10, 1997 || Nanyo || T. Okuni || — || align=right | 19 km || 
|-id=225 bgcolor=#d6d6d6
| 13225 Manfredi ||  ||  || August 29, 1997 || Bologna || San Vittore Obs. || — || align=right | 5.1 km || 
|-id=226 bgcolor=#d6d6d6
| 13226 Soulié || 1997 SH ||  || September 20, 1997 || Ondřejov || L. Kotková || EOS || align=right | 6.7 km || 
|-id=227 bgcolor=#d6d6d6
| 13227 Poor ||  ||  || September 27, 1997 || Kitt Peak || Spacewatch || HYG || align=right | 9.8 km || 
|-id=228 bgcolor=#d6d6d6
| 13228 ||  || — || September 29, 1997 || Nachi-Katsuura || Y. Shimizu, T. Urata || THM || align=right | 13 km || 
|-id=229 bgcolor=#C2FFFF
| 13229 Echion ||  ||  || November 2, 1997 || Kleť || J. Tichá, M. Tichý || L4 || align=right | 28 km || 
|-id=230 bgcolor=#C2FFFF
| 13230 ||  || — || November 1, 1997 || Oohira || T. Urata || L4 || align=right | 24 km || 
|-id=231 bgcolor=#d6d6d6
| 13231 Blondelet ||  ||  || January 17, 1998 || Caussols || ODAS || THM || align=right | 8.0 km || 
|-id=232 bgcolor=#fefefe
| 13232 ||  || — || March 20, 1998 || Socorro || LINEAR || — || align=right | 3.1 km || 
|-id=233 bgcolor=#fefefe
| 13233 ||  || — || March 20, 1998 || Socorro || LINEAR || — || align=right | 9.9 km || 
|-id=234 bgcolor=#fefefe
| 13234 Natashaowen ||  ||  || March 22, 1998 || Anderson Mesa || LONEOS || — || align=right | 4.1 km || 
|-id=235 bgcolor=#fefefe
| 13235 Isiguroyuki ||  ||  || April 30, 1998 || Nanyo || T. Okuni || — || align=right | 4.0 km || 
|-id=236 bgcolor=#fefefe
| 13236 ||  || — || April 21, 1998 || Socorro || LINEAR || FLO || align=right | 4.3 km || 
|-id=237 bgcolor=#fefefe
| 13237 ||  || — || April 21, 1998 || Socorro || LINEAR || — || align=right | 4.5 km || 
|-id=238 bgcolor=#fefefe
| 13238 Lambeaux ||  ||  || April 25, 1998 || La Silla || E. W. Elst || NYS || align=right | 5.3 km || 
|-id=239 bgcolor=#fefefe
| 13239 Kana || 1998 KN ||  || May 21, 1998 || Kuma Kogen || A. Nakamura || — || align=right | 2.6 km || 
|-id=240 bgcolor=#E9E9E9
| 13240 Thouvay ||  ||  || May 18, 1998 || Anderson Mesa || LONEOS || — || align=right | 5.7 km || 
|-id=241 bgcolor=#fefefe
| 13241 Biyo ||  ||  || May 22, 1998 || Socorro || LINEAR || — || align=right | 4.2 km || 
|-id=242 bgcolor=#fefefe
| 13242 ||  || — || May 22, 1998 || Socorro || LINEAR || NYS || align=right | 2.8 km || 
|-id=243 bgcolor=#fefefe
| 13243 ||  || — || May 22, 1998 || Socorro || LINEAR || V || align=right | 3.5 km || 
|-id=244 bgcolor=#d6d6d6
| 13244 Dannymeyer ||  ||  || June 26, 1998 || Catalina || CSS || — || align=right | 32 km || 
|-id=245 bgcolor=#fefefe
| 13245 ||  || — || June 23, 1998 || Socorro || LINEAR || H || align=right | 2.4 km || 
|-id=246 bgcolor=#E9E9E9
| 13246 ||  || — || June 24, 1998 || Socorro || LINEAR || VIB || align=right | 8.9 km || 
|-id=247 bgcolor=#fefefe
| 13247 ||  || — || June 24, 1998 || Socorro || LINEAR || FLO || align=right | 3.1 km || 
|-id=248 bgcolor=#E9E9E9
| 13248 Fornasier ||  ||  || June 24, 1998 || Anderson Mesa || LONEOS || — || align=right | 8.0 km || 
|-id=249 bgcolor=#E9E9E9
| 13249 Marcallen ||  ||  || June 18, 1998 || Anderson Mesa || LONEOS || — || align=right | 21 km || 
|-id=250 bgcolor=#fefefe
| 13250 Danieladucato || 1998 OJ ||  || July 19, 1998 || San Marcello || A. Boattini, L. Tesi || FLO || align=right | 2.4 km || 
|-id=251 bgcolor=#fefefe
| 13251 Viot || 1998 OP ||  || July 20, 1998 || Caussols || ODAS || FLO || align=right | 3.9 km || 
|-id=252 bgcolor=#E9E9E9
| 13252 ||  || — || July 18, 1998 || Bergisch Gladbach || W. Bickel || DOR || align=right | 9.1 km || 
|-id=253 bgcolor=#fefefe
| 13253 Stejneger ||  ||  || July 26, 1998 || La Silla || E. W. Elst || FLO || align=right | 2.4 km || 
|-id=254 bgcolor=#fefefe
| 13254 Kekulé ||  ||  || July 26, 1998 || La Silla || E. W. Elst || — || align=right | 2.8 km || 
|-id=255 bgcolor=#fefefe
| 13255 ||  || — || July 26, 1998 || La Silla || E. W. Elst || — || align=right | 4.4 km || 
|-id=256 bgcolor=#fefefe
| 13256 Marne ||  ||  || July 26, 1998 || La Silla || E. W. Elst || — || align=right | 5.8 km || 
|-id=257 bgcolor=#E9E9E9
| 13257 ||  || — || August 17, 1998 || Socorro || LINEAR || — || align=right | 6.1 km || 
|-id=258 bgcolor=#fefefe
| 13258 Bej ||  ||  || August 17, 1998 || Socorro || LINEAR || V || align=right | 3.0 km || 
|-id=259 bgcolor=#fefefe
| 13259 Bhat ||  ||  || August 17, 1998 || Socorro || LINEAR || V || align=right | 2.7 km || 
|-id=260 bgcolor=#E9E9E9
| 13260 Sabadell ||  ||  || August 23, 1998 || Montjoia || F. Casarramona, A. Vidal || EUN || align=right | 5.3 km || 
|-id=261 bgcolor=#E9E9E9
| 13261 ||  || — || August 17, 1998 || Socorro || LINEAR || — || align=right | 3.6 km || 
|-id=262 bgcolor=#fefefe
| 13262 ||  || — || August 17, 1998 || Socorro || LINEAR || V || align=right | 3.6 km || 
|-id=263 bgcolor=#d6d6d6
| 13263 ||  || — || August 17, 1998 || Socorro || LINEAR || — || align=right | 11 km || 
|-id=264 bgcolor=#fefefe
| 13264 ||  || — || August 17, 1998 || Socorro || LINEAR || — || align=right | 4.7 km || 
|-id=265 bgcolor=#fefefe
| 13265 Terbunkley ||  ||  || August 17, 1998 || Socorro || LINEAR || FLO || align=right | 2.7 km || 
|-id=266 bgcolor=#d6d6d6
| 13266 ||  || — || August 17, 1998 || Socorro || LINEAR || KOR || align=right | 4.6 km || 
|-id=267 bgcolor=#d6d6d6
| 13267 ||  || — || August 17, 1998 || Socorro || LINEAR || HYG || align=right | 9.2 km || 
|-id=268 bgcolor=#E9E9E9
| 13268 Trevorcorbin ||  ||  || August 17, 1998 || Socorro || LINEAR || — || align=right | 4.2 km || 
|-id=269 bgcolor=#fefefe
| 13269 Dahlstrom ||  ||  || August 17, 1998 || Socorro || LINEAR || V || align=right | 2.7 km || 
|-id=270 bgcolor=#d6d6d6
| 13270 ||  || — || August 17, 1998 || Socorro || LINEAR || KOR || align=right | 4.9 km || 
|-id=271 bgcolor=#E9E9E9
| 13271 ||  || — || August 17, 1998 || Socorro || LINEAR || — || align=right | 4.5 km || 
|-id=272 bgcolor=#fefefe
| 13272 Ericadavid ||  ||  || August 17, 1998 || Socorro || LINEAR || — || align=right | 3.0 km || 
|-id=273 bgcolor=#fefefe
| 13273 ||  || — || August 17, 1998 || Socorro || LINEAR || — || align=right | 2.9 km || 
|-id=274 bgcolor=#fefefe
| 13274 Roygross ||  ||  || August 17, 1998 || Socorro || LINEAR || — || align=right | 3.8 km || 
|-id=275 bgcolor=#E9E9E9
| 13275 ||  || — || August 17, 1998 || Socorro || LINEAR || — || align=right | 5.0 km || 
|-id=276 bgcolor=#E9E9E9
| 13276 ||  || — || August 17, 1998 || Socorro || LINEAR || EUN || align=right | 6.0 km || 
|-id=277 bgcolor=#E9E9E9
| 13277 ||  || — || August 17, 1998 || Socorro || LINEAR || — || align=right | 13 km || 
|-id=278 bgcolor=#fefefe
| 13278 Grotecloss ||  ||  || August 17, 1998 || Socorro || LINEAR || NYS || align=right | 3.0 km || 
|-id=279 bgcolor=#fefefe
| 13279 Gutman ||  ||  || August 17, 1998 || Socorro || LINEAR || FLO || align=right | 3.0 km || 
|-id=280 bgcolor=#fefefe
| 13280 Christihaas ||  ||  || August 17, 1998 || Socorro || LINEAR || — || align=right | 2.4 km || 
|-id=281 bgcolor=#fefefe
| 13281 Aliciahall ||  ||  || August 17, 1998 || Socorro || LINEAR || NYS || align=right | 2.5 km || 
|-id=282 bgcolor=#E9E9E9
| 13282 ||  || — || August 17, 1998 || Socorro || LINEAR || — || align=right | 4.8 km || 
|-id=283 bgcolor=#fefefe
| 13283 Dahart ||  ||  || August 17, 1998 || Socorro || LINEAR || MAS || align=right | 3.6 km || 
|-id=284 bgcolor=#E9E9E9
| 13284 ||  || — || August 17, 1998 || Socorro || LINEAR || EUN || align=right | 6.4 km || 
|-id=285 bgcolor=#fefefe
| 13285 Stephicks ||  ||  || August 17, 1998 || Socorro || LINEAR || — || align=right | 3.9 km || 
|-id=286 bgcolor=#fefefe
| 13286 Adamchauvin ||  ||  || August 20, 1998 || Anderson Mesa || LONEOS || V || align=right | 4.4 km || 
|-id=287 bgcolor=#fefefe
| 13287 ||  || — || August 29, 1998 || Višnjan Observatory || Višnjan Obs. || V || align=right | 3.4 km || 
|-id=288 bgcolor=#E9E9E9
| 13288 ||  || — || August 24, 1998 || Socorro || LINEAR || — || align=right | 5.9 km || 
|-id=289 bgcolor=#d6d6d6
| 13289 ||  || — || August 24, 1998 || Socorro || LINEAR || EOS || align=right | 7.3 km || 
|-id=290 bgcolor=#E9E9E9
| 13290 ||  || — || August 24, 1998 || Socorro || LINEAR || HNS || align=right | 8.8 km || 
|-id=291 bgcolor=#d6d6d6
| 13291 ||  || — || August 24, 1998 || Socorro || LINEAR || — || align=right | 15 km || 
|-id=292 bgcolor=#E9E9E9
| 13292 ||  || — || August 28, 1998 || Socorro || LINEAR || — || align=right | 4.9 km || 
|-id=293 bgcolor=#fefefe
| 13293 Mechelen ||  ||  || August 26, 1998 || La Silla || E. W. Elst || — || align=right | 3.8 km || 
|-id=294 bgcolor=#fefefe
| 13294 Rockox ||  ||  || August 25, 1998 || La Silla || E. W. Elst || FLO || align=right | 5.2 km || 
|-id=295 bgcolor=#d6d6d6
| 13295 || 1998 RE || — || September 2, 1998 || Dynic || A. Sugie || — || align=right | 18 km || 
|-id=296 bgcolor=#d6d6d6
| 13296 || 1998 RV || — || September 11, 1998 || Woomera || F. B. Zoltowski || EOS || align=right | 13 km || 
|-id=297 bgcolor=#d6d6d6
| 13297 || 1998 RX || — || September 12, 1998 || Oizumi || T. Kobayashi || — || align=right | 23 km || 
|-id=298 bgcolor=#fefefe
| 13298 Namatjira ||  ||  || September 15, 1998 || Reedy Creek || J. Broughton || — || align=right | 5.1 km || 
|-id=299 bgcolor=#fefefe
| 13299 ||  || — || September 4, 1998 || Xinglong || SCAP || FLO || align=right | 4.1 km || 
|-id=300 bgcolor=#E9E9E9
| 13300 ||  || — || September 14, 1998 || Xinglong || SCAP || — || align=right | 3.7 km || 
|}

13301–13400 

|-bgcolor=#E9E9E9
| 13301 ||  || — || September 14, 1998 || Socorro || LINEAR || HEN || align=right | 3.8 km || 
|-id=302 bgcolor=#fefefe
| 13302 Kezmoh ||  ||  || September 14, 1998 || Socorro || LINEAR || FLO || align=right | 2.9 km || 
|-id=303 bgcolor=#E9E9E9
| 13303 Asmitakumar ||  ||  || September 14, 1998 || Socorro || LINEAR || — || align=right | 3.7 km || 
|-id=304 bgcolor=#d6d6d6
| 13304 ||  || — || September 14, 1998 || Socorro || LINEAR || EOS || align=right | 8.5 km || 
|-id=305 bgcolor=#fefefe
| 13305 Danielang ||  ||  || September 14, 1998 || Socorro || LINEAR || — || align=right | 3.0 km || 
|-id=306 bgcolor=#d6d6d6
| 13306 ||  || — || September 14, 1998 || Socorro || LINEAR || KOR || align=right | 7.1 km || 
|-id=307 bgcolor=#d6d6d6
| 13307 ||  || — || September 14, 1998 || Socorro || LINEAR || — || align=right | 9.9 km || 
|-id=308 bgcolor=#E9E9E9
| 13308 ||  || — || September 14, 1998 || Socorro || LINEAR || AGN || align=right | 3.9 km || 
|-id=309 bgcolor=#d6d6d6
| 13309 ||  || — || September 14, 1998 || Socorro || LINEAR || — || align=right | 7.3 km || 
|-id=310 bgcolor=#d6d6d6
| 13310 ||  || — || September 14, 1998 || Socorro || LINEAR || — || align=right | 9.2 km || 
|-id=311 bgcolor=#E9E9E9
| 13311 ||  || — || September 14, 1998 || Socorro || LINEAR || — || align=right | 8.2 km || 
|-id=312 bgcolor=#E9E9E9
| 13312 ||  || — || September 14, 1998 || Socorro || LINEAR || — || align=right | 5.3 km || 
|-id=313 bgcolor=#d6d6d6
| 13313 ||  || — || September 14, 1998 || Socorro || LINEAR || HYG || align=right | 8.7 km || 
|-id=314 bgcolor=#E9E9E9
| 13314 ||  || — || September 14, 1998 || Socorro || LINEAR || HNA || align=right | 12 km || 
|-id=315 bgcolor=#fefefe
| 13315 Hilana ||  ||  || September 14, 1998 || Socorro || LINEAR || V || align=right | 3.3 km || 
|-id=316 bgcolor=#fefefe
| 13316 Llano ||  ||  || September 14, 1998 || Socorro || LINEAR || — || align=right | 2.9 km || 
|-id=317 bgcolor=#d6d6d6
| 13317 ||  || — || September 14, 1998 || Socorro || LINEAR || 3:2 || align=right | 13 km || 
|-id=318 bgcolor=#d6d6d6
| 13318 ||  || — || September 14, 1998 || Socorro || LINEAR || EOS || align=right | 7.2 km || 
|-id=319 bgcolor=#fefefe
| 13319 Michaelmi ||  ||  || September 14, 1998 || Socorro || LINEAR || FLO || align=right | 2.8 km || 
|-id=320 bgcolor=#fefefe
| 13320 Jessicamiles ||  ||  || September 14, 1998 || Socorro || LINEAR || NYS || align=right | 8.7 km || 
|-id=321 bgcolor=#d6d6d6
| 13321 ||  || — || September 14, 1998 || Socorro || LINEAR || EOS || align=right | 7.3 km || 
|-id=322 bgcolor=#d6d6d6
| 13322 ||  || — || September 14, 1998 || Socorro || LINEAR || HYG || align=right | 13 km || 
|-id=323 bgcolor=#C2FFFF
| 13323 || 1998 SQ || — || September 16, 1998 || Caussols || ODAS || L4 || align=right | 23 km || 
|-id=324 bgcolor=#d6d6d6
| 13324 ||  || — || September 18, 1998 || Zeno || T. Stafford || — || align=right | 10 km || 
|-id=325 bgcolor=#fefefe
| 13325 Valérienataf ||  ||  || September 18, 1998 || Anderson Mesa || LONEOS || — || align=right | 3.9 km || 
|-id=326 bgcolor=#d6d6d6
| 13326 Ferri ||  ||  || September 17, 1998 || Anderson Mesa || LONEOS || — || align=right | 11 km || 
|-id=327 bgcolor=#d6d6d6
| 13327 Reitsema ||  ||  || September 17, 1998 || Anderson Mesa || LONEOS || THM || align=right | 7.3 km || 
|-id=328 bgcolor=#d6d6d6
| 13328 Guetter ||  ||  || September 17, 1998 || Anderson Mesa || LONEOS || — || align=right | 7.0 km || 
|-id=329 bgcolor=#d6d6d6
| 13329 Davidhardy ||  ||  || September 20, 1998 || Kitt Peak || Spacewatch || — || align=right | 11 km || 
|-id=330 bgcolor=#d6d6d6
| 13330 Dondavis ||  ||  || September 25, 1998 || Kitt Peak || Spacewatch || THM || align=right | 13 km || 
|-id=331 bgcolor=#C2FFFF
| 13331 ||  || — || September 30, 1998 || Kitt Peak || Spacewatch || L4slow || align=right | 18 km || 
|-id=332 bgcolor=#d6d6d6
| 13332 Benkhoff ||  ||  || September 17, 1998 || Anderson Mesa || LONEOS || KOR || align=right | 4.9 km || 
|-id=333 bgcolor=#fefefe
| 13333 Carsenty ||  ||  || September 17, 1998 || Anderson Mesa || LONEOS || V || align=right | 2.6 km || 
|-id=334 bgcolor=#d6d6d6
| 13334 Tost ||  ||  || September 17, 1998 || Anderson Mesa || LONEOS || EOS || align=right | 5.3 km || 
|-id=335 bgcolor=#E9E9E9
| 13335 Tobiaswolf ||  ||  || September 17, 1998 || Anderson Mesa || LONEOS || — || align=right | 5.7 km || 
|-id=336 bgcolor=#d6d6d6
| 13336 ||  || — || September 26, 1998 || Socorro || LINEAR || — || align=right | 5.2 km || 
|-id=337 bgcolor=#E9E9E9
| 13337 ||  || — || September 26, 1998 || Socorro || LINEAR || — || align=right | 5.1 km || 
|-id=338 bgcolor=#E9E9E9
| 13338 ||  || — || September 26, 1998 || Socorro || LINEAR || GEF || align=right | 7.5 km || 
|-id=339 bgcolor=#d6d6d6
| 13339 ||  || — || September 26, 1998 || Socorro || LINEAR || EOS || align=right | 7.7 km || 
|-id=340 bgcolor=#E9E9E9
| 13340 ||  || — || September 26, 1998 || Socorro || LINEAR || — || align=right | 8.9 km || 
|-id=341 bgcolor=#E9E9E9
| 13341 ||  || — || September 26, 1998 || Socorro || LINEAR || — || align=right | 4.3 km || 
|-id=342 bgcolor=#d6d6d6
| 13342 ||  || — || September 26, 1998 || Socorro || LINEAR || — || align=right | 13 km || 
|-id=343 bgcolor=#E9E9E9
| 13343 ||  || — || September 26, 1998 || Socorro || LINEAR || PAD || align=right | 7.9 km || 
|-id=344 bgcolor=#d6d6d6
| 13344 ||  || — || September 26, 1998 || Socorro || LINEAR || KOR || align=right | 4.7 km || 
|-id=345 bgcolor=#d6d6d6
| 13345 ||  || — || September 26, 1998 || Socorro || LINEAR || EOS || align=right | 9.6 km || 
|-id=346 bgcolor=#fefefe
| 13346 Danielmiller ||  ||  || September 26, 1998 || Socorro || LINEAR || NYS || align=right | 2.6 km || 
|-id=347 bgcolor=#fefefe
| 13347 ||  || — || September 26, 1998 || Socorro || LINEAR || NYS || align=right | 2.2 km || 
|-id=348 bgcolor=#d6d6d6
| 13348 ||  || — || September 26, 1998 || Socorro || LINEAR || THM || align=right | 12 km || 
|-id=349 bgcolor=#E9E9E9
| 13349 ||  || — || September 26, 1998 || Socorro || LINEAR || PAD || align=right | 7.3 km || 
|-id=350 bgcolor=#d6d6d6
| 13350 Gmelin ||  ||  || September 20, 1998 || La Silla || E. W. Elst || — || align=right | 11 km || 
|-id=351 bgcolor=#fefefe
| 13351 Zibeline ||  ||  || September 20, 1998 || La Silla || E. W. Elst || FLO || align=right | 3.8 km || 
|-id=352 bgcolor=#E9E9E9
| 13352 Gyssens ||  ||  || September 18, 1998 || La Silla || E. W. Elst || EUN || align=right | 6.6 km || 
|-id=353 bgcolor=#C2FFFF
| 13353 ||  || — || October 13, 1998 || Kitt Peak || Spacewatch || L4 || align=right | 24 km || 
|-id=354 bgcolor=#E9E9E9
| 13354 ||  || — || October 15, 1998 || Caussols || ODAS || EUN || align=right | 5.1 km || 
|-id=355 bgcolor=#d6d6d6
| 13355 ||  || — || October 14, 1998 || Promiod || G. A. Sala || EOS || align=right | 14 km || 
|-id=356 bgcolor=#d6d6d6
| 13356 ||  || — || October 14, 1998 || Višnjan Observatory || K. Korlević || — || align=right | 17 km || 
|-id=357 bgcolor=#E9E9E9
| 13357 Werkhoven ||  ||  || October 15, 1998 || Kitt Peak || Spacewatch || — || align=right | 9.3 km || 
|-id=358 bgcolor=#E9E9E9
| 13358 Revelle ||  ||  || October 14, 1998 || Anderson Mesa || LONEOS || EUN || align=right | 7.5 km || 
|-id=359 bgcolor=#E9E9E9
| 13359 ||  || — || October 20, 1998 || Višnjan Observatory || K. Korlević || EUN || align=right | 6.8 km || 
|-id=360 bgcolor=#d6d6d6
| 13360 ||  || — || October 23, 1998 || Višnjan Observatory || K. Korlević || KOR || align=right | 7.6 km || 
|-id=361 bgcolor=#fefefe
| 13361 ||  || — || October 24, 1998 || Oizumi || T. Kobayashi || — || align=right | 4.1 km || 
|-id=362 bgcolor=#C2FFFF
| 13362 ||  || — || October 26, 1998 || Višnjan Observatory || K. Korlević || L4 || align=right | 28 km || 
|-id=363 bgcolor=#d6d6d6
| 13363 ||  || — || October 26, 1998 || Višnjan Observatory || K. Korlević || THM || align=right | 12 km || 
|-id=364 bgcolor=#E9E9E9
| 13364 ||  || — || October 20, 1998 || Kushiro || S. Ueda, H. Kaneda || — || align=right | 11 km || 
|-id=365 bgcolor=#d6d6d6
| 13365 Tenzinyama ||  ||  || October 26, 1998 || Nanyo || T. Okuni || EOS || align=right | 9.4 km || 
|-id=366 bgcolor=#C2FFFF
| 13366 ||  || — || October 18, 1998 || Anderson Mesa || LONEOS || L4slow? || align=right | 33 km || 
|-id=367 bgcolor=#d6d6d6
| 13367 Jiří ||  ||  || October 18, 1998 || Anderson Mesa || LONEOS || — || align=right | 15 km || 
|-id=368 bgcolor=#d6d6d6
| 13368 Wlodekofman ||  ||  || October 18, 1998 || Anderson Mesa || LONEOS || KOR || align=right | 4.4 km || 
|-id=369 bgcolor=#d6d6d6
| 13369 ||  || — || October 28, 1998 || Socorro || LINEAR || THM || align=right | 13 km || 
|-id=370 bgcolor=#fefefe
| 13370 Júliusbreza || 1998 VF ||  || November 7, 1998 || Modra || P. Kolény, L. Kornoš || FLO || align=right | 3.1 km || 
|-id=371 bgcolor=#fefefe
| 13371 ||  || — || November 8, 1998 || Nachi-Katsuura || Y. Shimizu, T. Urata || V || align=right | 3.9 km || 
|-id=372 bgcolor=#C2FFFF
| 13372 ||  || — || November 12, 1998 || Oizumi || T. Kobayashi || L4 || align=right | 25 km || 
|-id=373 bgcolor=#d6d6d6
| 13373 ||  || — || November 10, 1998 || Socorro || LINEAR || KOR || align=right | 5.3 km || 
|-id=374 bgcolor=#fefefe
| 13374 ||  || — || November 10, 1998 || Socorro || LINEAR || — || align=right | 5.8 km || 
|-id=375 bgcolor=#d6d6d6
| 13375 ||  || — || November 10, 1998 || Socorro || LINEAR || KOR || align=right | 5.0 km || 
|-id=376 bgcolor=#E9E9E9
| 13376 Dunphy ||  ||  || November 15, 1998 || Cocoa || I. P. Griffin || — || align=right | 13 km || 
|-id=377 bgcolor=#d6d6d6
| 13377 ||  || — || November 15, 1998 || Oizumi || T. Kobayashi || — || align=right | 9.2 km || 
|-id=378 bgcolor=#d6d6d6
| 13378 ||  || — || November 12, 1998 || Kushiro || S. Ueda, H. Kaneda || EOSslow || align=right | 14 km || 
|-id=379 bgcolor=#C2FFFF
| 13379 ||  || — || November 18, 1998 || Socorro || LINEAR || L4 || align=right | 21 km || 
|-id=380 bgcolor=#fefefe
| 13380 Yamamohammed ||  ||  || November 21, 1998 || Socorro || LINEAR || — || align=right | 3.7 km || 
|-id=381 bgcolor=#d6d6d6
| 13381 ||  || — || November 21, 1998 || Socorro || LINEAR || 3:2 || align=right | 16 km || 
|-id=382 bgcolor=#d6d6d6
| 13382 ||  || — || December 11, 1998 || Oizumi || T. Kobayashi || KOR || align=right | 7.6 km || 
|-id=383 bgcolor=#C2FFFF
| 13383 ||  || — || December 14, 1998 || Socorro || LINEAR || L4 || align=right | 24 km || 
|-id=384 bgcolor=#d6d6d6
| 13384 ||  || — || December 15, 1998 || Socorro || LINEAR || slow || align=right | 10 km || 
|-id=385 bgcolor=#C2FFFF
| 13385 ||  || — || December 15, 1998 || Socorro || LINEAR || L4 || align=right | 36 km || 
|-id=386 bgcolor=#d6d6d6
| 13386 ||  || — || December 15, 1998 || Socorro || LINEAR || — || align=right | 13 km || 
|-id=387 bgcolor=#C2FFFF
| 13387 Irus ||  ||  || December 22, 1998 || Farra d'Isonzo || Farra d'Isonzo || L4 || align=right | 19 km || 
|-id=388 bgcolor=#E9E9E9
| 13388 ||  || — || January 8, 1999 || Socorro || LINEAR || MAR || align=right | 8.2 km || 
|-id=389 bgcolor=#d6d6d6
| 13389 Stacey ||  ||  || January 10, 1999 || Fair Oaks Ranch || J. V. McClusky || — || align=right | 12 km || 
|-id=390 bgcolor=#E9E9E9
| 13390 Bouška ||  ||  || March 18, 1999 || Ondřejov || P. Pravec, M. Wolf || EUN || align=right | 7.5 km || 
|-id=391 bgcolor=#d6d6d6
| 13391 ||  || — || May 10, 1999 || Socorro || LINEAR || EOS || align=right | 12 km || 
|-id=392 bgcolor=#E9E9E9
| 13392 ||  || — || May 20, 1999 || Socorro || LINEAR || EUN || align=right | 4.1 km || 
|-id=393 bgcolor=#fefefe
| 13393 ||  || — || July 13, 1999 || Socorro || LINEAR || — || align=right | 4.6 km || 
|-id=394 bgcolor=#fefefe
| 13394 ||  || — || September 9, 1999 || Višnjan Observatory || K. Korlević || — || align=right | 4.1 km || 
|-id=395 bgcolor=#fefefe
| 13395 Deconihout ||  ||  || September 10, 1999 || Saint-Michel-sur-Meurthe || L. Bernasconi || NYS || align=right | 5.5 km || 
|-id=396 bgcolor=#E9E9E9
| 13396 Midavaine ||  ||  || September 11, 1999 || Saint-Michel-sur-Meurthe || L. Bernasconi || — || align=right | 4.9 km || 
|-id=397 bgcolor=#fefefe
| 13397 ||  || — || September 7, 1999 || Socorro || LINEAR || NYS || align=right | 2.7 km || 
|-id=398 bgcolor=#fefefe
| 13398 ||  || — || September 7, 1999 || Socorro || LINEAR || — || align=right | 5.0 km || 
|-id=399 bgcolor=#d6d6d6
| 13399 ||  || — || September 7, 1999 || Socorro || LINEAR || EOS || align=right | 10 km || 
|-id=400 bgcolor=#fefefe
| 13400 ||  || — || September 7, 1999 || Socorro || LINEAR || V || align=right | 3.1 km || 
|}

13401–13500 

|-bgcolor=#E9E9E9
| 13401 ||  || — || September 9, 1999 || Socorro || LINEAR || — || align=right | 10 km || 
|-id=402 bgcolor=#C2FFFF
| 13402 ||  || — || September 9, 1999 || Socorro || LINEAR || L5 || align=right | 23 km || 
|-id=403 bgcolor=#fefefe
| 13403 Sarahmousa ||  ||  || September 9, 1999 || Socorro || LINEAR || FLO || align=right | 3.6 km || 
|-id=404 bgcolor=#fefefe
| 13404 Norris ||  ||  || September 9, 1999 || Socorro || LINEAR || FLO || align=right | 2.7 km || 
|-id=405 bgcolor=#fefefe
| 13405 Dorisbillings ||  ||  || September 21, 1999 || Calgary || G. W. Billings || FLO || align=right | 4.1 km || 
|-id=406 bgcolor=#E9E9E9
| 13406 Sekora ||  ||  || October 2, 1999 || Ondřejov || L. Kotková || — || align=right | 10 km || 
|-id=407 bgcolor=#d6d6d6
| 13407 ||  || — || October 4, 1999 || JCPM Sapporo || K. Watanabe || — || align=right | 8.4 km || 
|-id=408 bgcolor=#fefefe
| 13408 Deadoklestic ||  ||  || October 10, 1999 || Višnjan Observatory || M. Jurić, K. Korlević || NYS || align=right | 6.9 km || 
|-id=409 bgcolor=#d6d6d6
| 13409 || 1999 US || — || October 16, 1999 || Višnjan Observatory || K. Korlević || — || align=right | 12 km || 
|-id=410 bgcolor=#fefefe
| 13410 Arhale ||  ||  || October 29, 1999 || Catalina || CSS || FLO || align=right | 2.7 km || 
|-id=411 bgcolor=#E9E9E9
| 13411 OLRAP ||  ||  || October 31, 1999 || Bédoin || P. Antonini || EUN || align=right | 5.4 km || 
|-id=412 bgcolor=#d6d6d6
| 13412 Guerrieri ||  ||  || October 29, 1999 || Catalina || CSS || KOR || align=right | 4.4 km || 
|-id=413 bgcolor=#d6d6d6
| 13413 Bobpeterson ||  ||  || October 29, 1999 || Catalina || CSS || — || align=right | 5.3 km || 
|-id=414 bgcolor=#d6d6d6
| 13414 Grantham ||  ||  || October 29, 1999 || Catalina || CSS || KOR || align=right | 4.4 km || 
|-id=415 bgcolor=#fefefe
| 13415 Stevenbland ||  ||  || October 29, 1999 || Catalina || CSS || NYS || align=right | 2.3 km || 
|-id=416 bgcolor=#d6d6d6
| 13416 Berryman ||  ||  || October 30, 1999 || Catalina || CSS || — || align=right | 14 km || 
|-id=417 bgcolor=#E9E9E9
| 13417 ||  || — || November 5, 1999 || Ōizumi || T. Kobayashi || — || align=right | 10 km || 
|-id=418 bgcolor=#fefefe
| 13418 ||  || — || November 8, 1999 || Višnjan Observatory || K. Korlević || MAS || align=right | 3.8 km || 
|-id=419 bgcolor=#d6d6d6
| 13419 ||  || — || November 9, 1999 || Ōizumi || T. Kobayashi || THM || align=right | 9.9 km || 
|-id=420 bgcolor=#E9E9E9
| 13420 ||  || — || November 9, 1999 || Ōizumi || T. Kobayashi || — || align=right | 11 km || 
|-id=421 bgcolor=#E9E9E9
| 13421 Holvorcem ||  ||  || November 11, 1999 || Fountain Hills || C. W. Juels || HEN || align=right | 6.6 km || 
|-id=422 bgcolor=#fefefe
| 13422 ||  || — || November 10, 1999 || Višnjan Observatory || K. Korlević || NYS || align=right | 2.2 km || 
|-id=423 bgcolor=#E9E9E9
| 13423 Bobwoolley ||  ||  || November 13, 1999 || Fountain Hills || C. W. Juels || PAD || align=right | 12 km || 
|-id=424 bgcolor=#E9E9E9
| 13424 Margalida ||  ||  || November 8, 1999 || Majorca || R. Pacheco, Á. López J. || — || align=right | 4.4 km || 
|-id=425 bgcolor=#d6d6d6
| 13425 Waynebrown ||  ||  || November 15, 1999 || Fountain Hills || C. W. Juels || — || align=right | 12 km || 
|-id=426 bgcolor=#fefefe
| 13426 ||  || — || November 13, 1999 || Ōizumi || T. Kobayashi || — || align=right | 6.0 km || 
|-id=427 bgcolor=#E9E9E9
| 13427 ||  || — || November 13, 1999 || Ōizumi || T. Kobayashi || — || align=right | 4.8 km || 
|-id=428 bgcolor=#d6d6d6
| 13428 ||  || — || November 3, 1999 || Socorro || LINEAR || — || align=right | 7.5 km || 
|-id=429 bgcolor=#d6d6d6
| 13429 ||  || — || November 3, 1999 || Socorro || LINEAR || 7:4 || align=right | 13 km || 
|-id=430 bgcolor=#E9E9E9
| 13430 ||  || — || November 3, 1999 || Socorro || LINEAR || — || align=right | 7.1 km || 
|-id=431 bgcolor=#E9E9E9
| 13431 ||  || — || November 3, 1999 || Socorro || LINEAR || — || align=right | 3.2 km || 
|-id=432 bgcolor=#d6d6d6
| 13432 ||  || — || November 3, 1999 || Socorro || LINEAR || KOR || align=right | 4.7 km || 
|-id=433 bgcolor=#fefefe
| 13433 Phelps ||  ||  || November 3, 1999 || Socorro || LINEAR || FLO || align=right | 3.0 km || 
|-id=434 bgcolor=#fefefe
| 13434 Adamquade ||  ||  || November 4, 1999 || Socorro || LINEAR || NYS || align=right | 2.4 km || 
|-id=435 bgcolor=#fefefe
| 13435 Rohret ||  ||  || November 4, 1999 || Socorro || LINEAR || — || align=right | 2.9 km || 
|-id=436 bgcolor=#d6d6d6
| 13436 Enid || 1999 WF ||  || November 17, 1999 || Zeno || T. Stafford || THM || align=right | 16 km || 
|-id=437 bgcolor=#fefefe
| 13437 Wellton-Persson ||  ||  || November 28, 1999 || Kvistaberg || UDAS || — || align=right | 2.8 km || 
|-id=438 bgcolor=#fefefe
| 13438 Marthanalexander ||  ||  || December 7, 1999 || Socorro || LINEAR || — || align=right | 2.6 km || 
|-id=439 bgcolor=#fefefe
| 13439 Frankiethomas || 2072 P-L ||  || September 24, 1960 || Palomar || PLS || — || align=right | 1.9 km || 
|-id=440 bgcolor=#E9E9E9
| 13440 || 2095 P-L || — || September 24, 1960 || Palomar || PLS || — || align=right | 3.4 km || 
|-id=441 bgcolor=#E9E9E9
| 13441 Janmerlin || 2098 P-L ||  || September 24, 1960 || Palomar || PLS || — || align=right | 6.4 km || 
|-id=442 bgcolor=#E9E9E9
| 13442 || 2646 P-L || — || September 24, 1960 || Palomar || PLS || — || align=right | 4.3 km || 
|-id=443 bgcolor=#E9E9E9
| 13443 || 2785 P-L || — || September 26, 1960 || Palomar || PLS || — || align=right | 3.9 km || 
|-id=444 bgcolor=#E9E9E9
| 13444 || 3040 P-L || — || September 24, 1960 || Palomar || PLS || — || align=right | 6.2 km || 
|-id=445 bgcolor=#d6d6d6
| 13445 || 3063 P-L || — || September 24, 1960 || Palomar || PLS || 7:4 || align=right | 16 km || 
|-id=446 bgcolor=#d6d6d6
| 13446 Almarkim || 3087 P-L ||  || September 24, 1960 || Palomar || PLS || EOS || align=right | 11 km || 
|-id=447 bgcolor=#E9E9E9
| 13447 || 4115 P-L || — || September 24, 1960 || Palomar || PLS || — || align=right | 3.8 km || 
|-id=448 bgcolor=#fefefe
| 13448 Edbryce || 4526 P-L ||  || September 24, 1960 || Palomar || PLS || NYS || align=right | 4.7 km || 
|-id=449 bgcolor=#d6d6d6
| 13449 Margaretgarland || 4845 P-L ||  || September 24, 1960 || Palomar || PLS || — || align=right | 8.3 km || 
|-id=450 bgcolor=#d6d6d6
| 13450 || 6077 P-L || — || September 24, 1960 || Palomar || PLS || — || align=right | 8.7 km || 
|-id=451 bgcolor=#d6d6d6
| 13451 || 6103 P-L || — || September 24, 1960 || Palomar || PLS || — || align=right | 5.9 km || 
|-id=452 bgcolor=#E9E9E9
| 13452 || 6513 P-L || — || September 24, 1960 || Palomar || PLS || — || align=right | 4.6 km || 
|-id=453 bgcolor=#d6d6d6
| 13453 || 6538 P-L || — || September 24, 1960 || Palomar || PLS || — || align=right | 12 km || 
|-id=454 bgcolor=#fefefe
| 13454 || 6594 P-L || — || September 24, 1960 || Palomar || PLS || — || align=right | 3.0 km || 
|-id=455 bgcolor=#fefefe
| 13455 || 6626 P-L || — || September 24, 1960 || Palomar || PLS || — || align=right | 4.2 km || 
|-id=456 bgcolor=#d6d6d6
| 13456 || 6640 P-L || — || September 26, 1960 || Palomar || PLS || HYG || align=right | 8.6 km || 
|-id=457 bgcolor=#d6d6d6
| 13457 || 6761 P-L || — || September 24, 1960 || Palomar || PLS || EOS || align=right | 6.7 km || 
|-id=458 bgcolor=#E9E9E9
| 13458 || 4214 T-1 || — || March 26, 1971 || Palomar || PLS || — || align=right | 3.6 km || 
|-id=459 bgcolor=#fefefe
| 13459 || 4235 T-1 || — || March 26, 1971 || Palomar || PLS || — || align=right | 2.2 km || 
|-id=460 bgcolor=#E9E9E9
| 13460 || 1083 T-2 || — || September 29, 1973 || Palomar || PLS || — || align=right | 4.9 km || 
|-id=461 bgcolor=#fefefe
| 13461 || 1607 T-2 || — || September 24, 1973 || Palomar || PLS || — || align=right | 3.3 km || 
|-id=462 bgcolor=#fefefe
| 13462 || 2076 T-2 || — || September 29, 1973 || Palomar || PLS || — || align=right | 2.5 km || 
|-id=463 bgcolor=#C2FFFF
| 13463 Antiphos || 5159 T-2 ||  || September 25, 1973 || Palomar || PLS || L4 || align=right | 25 km || 
|-id=464 bgcolor=#d6d6d6
| 13464 || 1036 T-3 || — || October 17, 1977 || Palomar || PLS || — || align=right | 14 km || 
|-id=465 bgcolor=#fefefe
| 13465 || 1194 T-3 || — || October 17, 1977 || Palomar || PLS || V || align=right | 3.0 km || 
|-id=466 bgcolor=#d6d6d6
| 13466 || 2349 T-3 || — || October 16, 1977 || Palomar || PLS || EOS || align=right | 7.2 km || 
|-id=467 bgcolor=#fefefe
| 13467 || 2676 T-3 || — || October 11, 1977 || Palomar || PLS || FLO || align=right | 2.6 km || 
|-id=468 bgcolor=#fefefe
| 13468 || 3378 T-3 || — || October 16, 1977 || Palomar || PLS || slow || align=right | 2.4 km || 
|-id=469 bgcolor=#E9E9E9
| 13469 || 3424 T-3 || — || October 16, 1977 || Palomar || PLS || — || align=right | 2.8 km || 
|-id=470 bgcolor=#E9E9E9
| 13470 || 3517 T-3 || — || October 16, 1977 || Palomar || PLS || — || align=right | 6.0 km || 
|-id=471 bgcolor=#fefefe
| 13471 || 4046 T-3 || — || October 16, 1977 || Palomar || PLS || FLO || align=right | 3.3 km || 
|-id=472 bgcolor=#d6d6d6
| 13472 || 4064 T-3 || — || October 16, 1977 || Palomar || PLS || — || align=right | 6.9 km || 
|-id=473 bgcolor=#fefefe
| 13473 Hokema || 1953 GJ ||  || April 7, 1953 || Heidelberg || K. Reinmuth || — || align=right | 2.5 km || 
|-id=474 bgcolor=#E9E9E9
| 13474 Vʹyus ||  ||  || August 29, 1973 || Nauchnij || T. M. Smirnova || — || align=right | 6.9 km || 
|-id=475 bgcolor=#C2FFFF
| 13475 Orestes || 1973 SX ||  || September 19, 1973 || Palomar || PLS || L4 || align=right | 22 km || 
|-id=476 bgcolor=#fefefe
| 13476 || 1974 QF || — || August 16, 1974 || El Leoncito || Félix Aguilar Obs. || — || align=right | 2.7 km || 
|-id=477 bgcolor=#fefefe
| 13477 Utkin ||  ||  || November 5, 1975 || Nauchnij || L. I. Chernykh || — || align=right | 5.2 km || 
|-id=478 bgcolor=#fefefe
| 13478 Fraunhofer ||  ||  || February 27, 1976 || Tautenburg Observatory || F. Börngen || H || align=right | 1.9 km || 
|-id=479 bgcolor=#fefefe
| 13479 Vet ||  ||  || October 8, 1977 || Nauchnij || L. I. Chernykh || — || align=right | 3.0 km || 
|-id=480 bgcolor=#fefefe
| 13480 Potapov ||  ||  || August 9, 1978 || Nauchnij || N. S. Chernykh, L. I. Chernykh || FLO || align=right | 2.3 km || 
|-id=481 bgcolor=#E9E9E9
| 13481 ||  || — || November 6, 1978 || Palomar || E. F. Helin, S. J. Bus || — || align=right | 2.9 km || 
|-id=482 bgcolor=#d6d6d6
| 13482 Igorfedorov ||  ||  || April 25, 1979 || Nauchnij || N. S. Chernykh || — || align=right | 11 km || 
|-id=483 bgcolor=#fefefe
| 13483 || 1980 SF || — || September 16, 1980 || Kleť || Z. Vávrová || NYS || align=right | 2.6 km || 
|-id=484 bgcolor=#fefefe
| 13484 ||  || — || March 1, 1981 || Siding Spring || S. J. Bus || — || align=right | 2.4 km || 
|-id=485 bgcolor=#d6d6d6
| 13485 ||  || — || August 25, 1981 || La Silla || H. Debehogne || THM || align=right | 11 km || 
|-id=486 bgcolor=#d6d6d6
| 13486 ||  || — || October 24, 1981 || Palomar || S. J. Bus || — || align=right | 11 km || 
|-id=487 bgcolor=#E9E9E9
| 13487 || 1981 VN || — || November 2, 1981 || Anderson Mesa || B. A. Skiff || MAR || align=right | 8.9 km || 
|-id=488 bgcolor=#d6d6d6
| 13488 Savanov ||  ||  || October 14, 1982 || Nauchnij || L. G. Karachkina || EOS || align=right | 14 km || 
|-id=489 bgcolor=#d6d6d6
| 13489 Dmitrienko ||  ||  || October 20, 1982 || Nauchnij || L. G. Karachkina || EOS || align=right | 8.0 km || 
|-id=490 bgcolor=#d6d6d6
| 13490 ||  || — || January 26, 1984 || Palomar || E. Bowell || — || align=right | 6.3 km || 
|-id=491 bgcolor=#fefefe
| 13491 ||  || — || October 28, 1984 || Kleť || A. Mrkos || ERI || align=right | 6.3 km || 
|-id=492 bgcolor=#fefefe
| 13492 Vitalijzakharov ||  ||  || December 27, 1984 || Nauchnij || L. G. Karachkina || — || align=right | 2.5 km || 
|-id=493 bgcolor=#E9E9E9
| 13493 Lockwood || 1985 PT ||  || August 14, 1985 || Anderson Mesa || E. Bowell || ADE || align=right | 11 km || 
|-id=494 bgcolor=#fefefe
| 13494 Treiso || 1985 RT ||  || September 14, 1985 || Anderson Mesa || E. Bowell || — || align=right | 3.1 km || 
|-id=495 bgcolor=#fefefe
| 13495 ||  || — || September 6, 1985 || La Silla || H. Debehogne || — || align=right | 2.6 km || 
|-id=496 bgcolor=#E9E9E9
| 13496 ||  || — || September 6, 1985 || La Silla || H. Debehogne || — || align=right | 3.3 km || 
|-id=497 bgcolor=#fefefe
| 13497 Ronstone ||  ||  || March 5, 1986 || Anderson Mesa || E. Bowell || PHO || align=right | 4.8 km || 
|-id=498 bgcolor=#fefefe
| 13498 Al Chwarizmi || 1986 PX ||  || August 6, 1986 || Smolyan || E. W. Elst, V. G. Ivanova || — || align=right | 3.1 km || 
|-id=499 bgcolor=#d6d6d6
| 13499 Steinberg ||  ||  || October 1, 1986 || Caussols || CERGA || THM || align=right | 9.4 km || 
|-id=500 bgcolor=#E9E9E9
| 13500 Viscardy || 1987 PM ||  || August 6, 1987 || Caussols || CERGA || — || align=right | 16 km || 
|}

13501–13600 

|-bgcolor=#d6d6d6
| 13501 || 1987 VR || — || November 15, 1987 || Kleť || A. Mrkos || EOS || align=right | 9.3 km || 
|-id=502 bgcolor=#fefefe
| 13502 || 1987 WD || — || November 17, 1987 || Kushiro || S. Ueda, H. Kaneda || — || align=right | 7.9 km || 
|-id=503 bgcolor=#fefefe
| 13503 ||  || — || September 6, 1988 || La Silla || H. Debehogne || — || align=right | 4.1 km || 
|-id=504 bgcolor=#d6d6d6
| 13504 ||  || — || September 14, 1988 || Cerro Tololo || S. J. Bus || 3:2 || align=right | 23 km || 
|-id=505 bgcolor=#d6d6d6
| 13505 ||  || — || January 4, 1989 || Siding Spring || R. H. McNaught || EOS || align=right | 7.7 km || 
|-id=506 bgcolor=#fefefe
| 13506 ||  || — || January 4, 1989 || Siding Spring || R. H. McNaught || — || align=right | 3.8 km || 
|-id=507 bgcolor=#d6d6d6
| 13507 ||  || — || January 4, 1989 || Siding Spring || R. H. McNaught || — || align=right | 5.8 km || 
|-id=508 bgcolor=#fefefe
| 13508 || 1989 DC || — || February 27, 1989 || Dynic || A. Sugie || V || align=right | 4.7 km || 
|-id=509 bgcolor=#fefefe
| 13509 Guayaquil ||  ||  || April 4, 1989 || La Silla || E. W. Elst || SUL || align=right | 10 km || 
|-id=510 bgcolor=#E9E9E9
| 13510 || 1989 OL || — || July 29, 1989 || Lake Tekapo || A. C. Gilmore, P. M. Kilmartin || — || align=right | 4.7 km || 
|-id=511 bgcolor=#E9E9E9
| 13511 ||  || — || September 5, 1989 || Lake Tekapo || A. C. Gilmore, P. M. Kilmartin || EUN || align=right | 7.6 km || 
|-id=512 bgcolor=#E9E9E9
| 13512 ||  || — || October 8, 1989 || Dynic || A. Sugie || — || align=right | 10 km || 
|-id=513 bgcolor=#fefefe
| 13513 Manila ||  ||  || March 2, 1990 || La Silla || E. W. Elst || FLO || align=right | 1.9 km || 
|-id=514 bgcolor=#fefefe
| 13514 Mikerudenko || 1990 MR ||  || June 18, 1990 || Palomar || H. E. Holt || — || align=right | 4.8 km || 
|-id=515 bgcolor=#E9E9E9
| 13515 ||  || — || September 19, 1990 || Palomar || H. E. Holt || — || align=right | 3.3 km || 
|-id=516 bgcolor=#E9E9E9
| 13516 ||  || — || October 20, 1990 || Dynic || A. Sugie || — || align=right | 3.7 km || 
|-id=517 bgcolor=#E9E9E9
| 13517 ||  || — || October 20, 1990 || Siding Spring || R. H. McNaught || EUN || align=right | 3.1 km || 
|-id=518 bgcolor=#E9E9E9
| 13518 ||  || — || November 12, 1990 || Kushiro || S. Ueda, H. Kaneda || — || align=right | 4.3 km || 
|-id=519 bgcolor=#E9E9E9
| 13519 ||  || — || November 15, 1990 || Dynic || A. Sugie || — || align=right | 5.5 km || 
|-id=520 bgcolor=#E9E9E9
| 13520 Félicienrops ||  ||  || November 15, 1990 || La Silla || E. W. Elst || — || align=right | 7.2 km || 
|-id=521 bgcolor=#E9E9E9
| 13521 || 1991 BK || — || January 19, 1991 || Okutama || T. Hioki, S. Hayakawa || — || align=right | 7.4 km || 
|-id=522 bgcolor=#E9E9E9
| 13522 || 1991 FG || — || March 18, 1991 || Siding Spring || R. H. McNaught || — || align=right | 4.2 km || 
|-id=523 bgcolor=#d6d6d6
| 13523 Vanhassel ||  ||  || June 6, 1991 || La Silla || E. W. Elst || — || align=right | 7.1 km || 
|-id=524 bgcolor=#fefefe
| 13524 || 1991 OO || — || July 18, 1991 || Palomar || H. E. Holt || — || align=right | 2.8 km || 
|-id=525 bgcolor=#d6d6d6
| 13525 Paulledoux ||  ||  || August 2, 1991 || La Silla || E. W. Elst || — || align=right | 8.7 km || 
|-id=526 bgcolor=#fefefe
| 13526 Libbrecht ||  ||  || August 3, 1991 || La Silla || E. W. Elst || V || align=right | 2.1 km || 
|-id=527 bgcolor=#fefefe
| 13527 ||  || — || August 7, 1991 || Palomar || H. E. Holt || — || align=right | 3.2 km || 
|-id=528 bgcolor=#fefefe
| 13528 ||  || — || August 7, 1991 || Palomar || H. E. Holt || PHO || align=right | 3.6 km || 
|-id=529 bgcolor=#fefefe
| 13529 Yokaboshi ||  ||  || September 1, 1991 || Geisei || T. Seki || FLO || align=right | 4.0 km || 
|-id=530 bgcolor=#fefefe
| 13530 Ninnemann ||  ||  || September 9, 1991 || Tautenburg Observatory || L. D. Schmadel, F. Börngen || V || align=right | 4.8 km || 
|-id=531 bgcolor=#d6d6d6
| 13531 Weizsäcker ||  ||  || September 13, 1991 || Tautenburg Observatory || F. Börngen, L. D. Schmadel || — || align=right | 8.7 km || 
|-id=532 bgcolor=#fefefe
| 13532 ||  || — || September 11, 1991 || Palomar || H. E. Holt || — || align=right | 3.0 km || 
|-id=533 bgcolor=#d6d6d6
| 13533 Junili ||  ||  || September 4, 1991 || La Silla || E. W. Elst || — || align=right | 10 km || 
|-id=534 bgcolor=#d6d6d6
| 13534 Alain-Fournier ||  ||  || September 4, 1991 || La Silla || E. W. Elst || THM || align=right | 11 km || 
|-id=535 bgcolor=#fefefe
| 13535 ||  || — || September 13, 1991 || Palomar || H. E. Holt || — || align=right | 4.0 km || 
|-id=536 bgcolor=#d6d6d6
| 13536 ||  || — || September 15, 1991 || Palomar || H. E. Holt || THM || align=right | 11 km || 
|-id=537 bgcolor=#d6d6d6
| 13537 || 1991 SG || — || September 29, 1991 || Siding Spring || R. H. McNaught || VER || align=right | 13 km || 
|-id=538 bgcolor=#fefefe
| 13538 || 1991 ST || — || September 30, 1991 || Siding Spring || R. H. McNaught || — || align=right | 4.8 km || 
|-id=539 bgcolor=#fefefe
| 13539 || 1991 TY || — || October 2, 1991 || Siding Spring || R. H. McNaught || PHO || align=right | 3.1 km || 
|-id=540 bgcolor=#fefefe
| 13540 Kazukitakahashi ||  ||  || October 29, 1991 || Kitami || A. Takahashi, K. Watanabe || — || align=right | 3.5 km || 
|-id=541 bgcolor=#fefefe
| 13541 ||  || — || November 4, 1991 || Kushiro || S. Ueda, H. Kaneda || — || align=right | 4.4 km || 
|-id=542 bgcolor=#fefefe
| 13542 ||  || — || November 10, 1991 || Kiyosato || S. Otomo || V || align=right | 4.3 km || 
|-id=543 bgcolor=#fefefe
| 13543 Butler ||  ||  || January 2, 1992 || Kitt Peak || Spacewatch || — || align=right | 5.0 km || 
|-id=544 bgcolor=#E9E9E9
| 13544 ||  || — || February 29, 1992 || La Silla || UESAC || BRG || align=right | 4.9 km || 
|-id=545 bgcolor=#E9E9E9
| 13545 ||  || — || February 29, 1992 || La Silla || UESAC || — || align=right | 3.7 km || 
|-id=546 bgcolor=#E9E9E9
| 13546 ||  || — || February 29, 1992 || La Silla || UESAC || — || align=right | 5.1 km || 
|-id=547 bgcolor=#E9E9E9
| 13547 ||  || — || February 29, 1992 || La Silla || UESAC || — || align=right | 2.4 km || 
|-id=548 bgcolor=#E9E9E9
| 13548 ||  || — || March 8, 1992 || Kushiro || S. Ueda, H. Kaneda || — || align=right | 5.3 km || 
|-id=549 bgcolor=#fefefe
| 13549 ||  || — || March 2, 1992 || La Silla || UESAC || NYS || align=right | 3.9 km || 
|-id=550 bgcolor=#E9E9E9
| 13550 ||  || — || March 2, 1992 || La Silla || UESAC || — || align=right | 3.4 km || 
|-id=551 bgcolor=#FA8072
| 13551 Gadsden ||  ||  || March 26, 1992 || Siding Spring || R. H. McNaught || — || align=right | 1.6 km || 
|-id=552 bgcolor=#E9E9E9
| 13552 || 1992 GA || — || April 4, 1992 || Lake Tekapo || A. C. Gilmore, P. M. Kilmartin || EUN || align=right | 5.3 km || 
|-id=553 bgcolor=#FFC2E0
| 13553 Masaakikoyama || 1992 JE ||  || May 2, 1992 || Geisei || T. Seki || AMO +1km || align=right | 1.8 km || 
|-id=554 bgcolor=#E9E9E9
| 13554 Decleir ||  ||  || May 8, 1992 || La Silla || H. Debehogne || XIZ || align=right | 5.9 km || 
|-id=555 bgcolor=#E9E9E9
| 13555 ||  || — || May 2, 1992 || La Silla || H. Debehogne || — || align=right | 13 km || 
|-id=556 bgcolor=#d6d6d6
| 13556 ||  || — || July 21, 1992 || La Silla || H. Debehogne, Á. López-G. || — || align=right | 14 km || 
|-id=557 bgcolor=#E9E9E9
| 13557 Lievetruwant ||  ||  || July 24, 1992 || La Silla || H. Debehogne || — || align=right | 6.2 km || 
|-id=558 bgcolor=#d6d6d6
| 13558 ||  || — || August 5, 1992 || La Silla || H. Debehogne, Á. López-G. || — || align=right | 8.1 km || 
|-id=559 bgcolor=#d6d6d6
| 13559 Werth ||  ||  || September 4, 1992 || Tautenburg Observatory || L. D. Schmadel, F. Börngen || — || align=right | 11 km || 
|-id=560 bgcolor=#d6d6d6
| 13560 La Pérouse ||  ||  || September 2, 1992 || La Silla || E. W. Elst || EOS || align=right | 9.0 km || 
|-id=561 bgcolor=#d6d6d6
| 13561 Kudogou ||  ||  || September 23, 1992 || Kitami || M. Yanai, K. Watanabe || — || align=right | 20 km || 
|-id=562 bgcolor=#d6d6d6
| 13562 Bobeggleton ||  ||  || September 28, 1992 || Kitt Peak || Spacewatch || THM || align=right | 7.8 km || 
|-id=563 bgcolor=#E9E9E9
| 13563 || 1992 UW || — || October 21, 1992 || Kiyosato || S. Otomo || — || align=right | 4.8 km || 
|-id=564 bgcolor=#fefefe
| 13564 Kodomomiraikan ||  ||  || October 19, 1992 || Kitami || M. Yanai, K. Watanabe || — || align=right | 2.2 km || 
|-id=565 bgcolor=#d6d6d6
| 13565 Yotakanashi ||  ||  || October 28, 1992 || Kitami || K. Endate, K. Watanabe || — || align=right | 12 km || 
|-id=566 bgcolor=#d6d6d6
| 13566 ||  || — || October 19, 1992 || Kushiro || S. Ueda, H. Kaneda || — || align=right | 12 km || 
|-id=567 bgcolor=#d6d6d6
| 13567 Urabe ||  ||  || November 16, 1992 || Kitami || K. Endate, K. Watanabe || — || align=right | 13 km || 
|-id=568 bgcolor=#d6d6d6
| 13568 ||  || — || November 21, 1992 || Uenohara || N. Kawasato || — || align=right | 15 km || 
|-id=569 bgcolor=#fefefe
| 13569 Oshu || 1993 EJ ||  || March 4, 1993 || Geisei || T. Seki || V || align=right | 2.4 km || 
|-id=570 bgcolor=#fefefe
| 13570 ||  || — || March 17, 1993 || La Silla || UESAC || NYS || align=right | 2.7 km || 
|-id=571 bgcolor=#fefefe
| 13571 ||  || — || March 17, 1993 || La Silla || UESAC || V || align=right | 2.3 km || 
|-id=572 bgcolor=#fefefe
| 13572 ||  || — || March 17, 1993 || La Silla || UESAC || NYS || align=right | 2.0 km || 
|-id=573 bgcolor=#fefefe
| 13573 ||  || — || March 17, 1993 || La Silla || UESAC || FLO || align=right | 4.5 km || 
|-id=574 bgcolor=#fefefe
| 13574 ||  || — || March 21, 1993 || La Silla || UESAC || — || align=right | 8.2 km || 
|-id=575 bgcolor=#fefefe
| 13575 || 1993 GN || — || April 14, 1993 || Kiyosato || S. Otomo || — || align=right | 7.1 km || 
|-id=576 bgcolor=#fefefe
| 13576 Gotoyoshi || 1993 HW ||  || April 16, 1993 || Kitami || K. Endate, K. Watanabe || NYS || align=right | 4.1 km || 
|-id=577 bgcolor=#fefefe
| 13577 Ukawa ||  ||  || April 16, 1993 || Kitami || K. Endate, K. Watanabe || NYS || align=right | 2.7 km || 
|-id=578 bgcolor=#fefefe
| 13578 || 1993 MK || — || June 17, 1993 || Palomar || H. E. Holt || H || align=right | 3.5 km || 
|-id=579 bgcolor=#E9E9E9
| 13579 Allodd ||  ||  || July 12, 1993 || La Silla || E. W. Elst || — || align=right | 5.2 km || 
|-id=580 bgcolor=#E9E9E9
| 13580 de Saussure ||  ||  || July 20, 1993 || La Silla || E. W. Elst || — || align=right | 6.4 km || 
|-id=581 bgcolor=#E9E9E9
| 13581 ||  || — || August 19, 1993 || Palomar || E. F. Helin || MAR || align=right | 7.5 km || 
|-id=582 bgcolor=#E9E9E9
| 13582 Tominari ||  ||  || October 15, 1993 || Kitami || K. Endate, K. Watanabe || EUN || align=right | 7.1 km || 
|-id=583 bgcolor=#E9E9E9
| 13583 Bosret ||  ||  || October 9, 1993 || La Silla || E. W. Elst || HEN || align=right | 5.2 km || 
|-id=584 bgcolor=#d6d6d6
| 13584 ||  || — || October 9, 1993 || La Silla || E. W. Elst || — || align=right | 6.6 km || 
|-id=585 bgcolor=#E9E9E9
| 13585 Justinsmith ||  ||  || October 9, 1993 || La Silla || E. W. Elst || AGN || align=right | 5.6 km || 
|-id=586 bgcolor=#d6d6d6
| 13586 Copenhagen ||  ||  || October 9, 1993 || La Silla || E. W. Elst || EOS || align=right | 8.4 km || 
|-id=587 bgcolor=#d6d6d6
| 13587 ||  || — || October 9, 1993 || La Silla || E. W. Elst || — || align=right | 5.2 km || 
|-id=588 bgcolor=#E9E9E9
| 13588 ||  || — || October 9, 1993 || La Silla || E. W. Elst || HOF || align=right | 8.1 km || 
|-id=589 bgcolor=#d6d6d6
| 13589 || 1993 XM || — || December 8, 1993 || Oizumi || T. Kobayashi || — || align=right | 11 km || 
|-id=590 bgcolor=#d6d6d6
| 13590 ||  || — || January 14, 1994 || Oizumi || T. Kobayashi || THM || align=right | 8.6 km || 
|-id=591 bgcolor=#d6d6d6
| 13591 ||  || — || January 16, 1994 || Oizumi || T. Kobayashi || MEL || align=right | 8.0 km || 
|-id=592 bgcolor=#fefefe
| 13592 || 1994 JU || — || May 8, 1994 || Oizumi || T. Kobayashi || — || align=right | 3.4 km || 
|-id=593 bgcolor=#fefefe
| 13593 ||  || — || July 4, 1994 || Palomar || E. F. Helin || slow || align=right | 4.8 km || 
|-id=594 bgcolor=#fefefe
| 13594 ||  || — || August 9, 1994 || Palomar || PCAS || NYS || align=right | 3.0 km || 
|-id=595 bgcolor=#E9E9E9
| 13595 ||  || — || August 10, 1994 || La Silla || E. W. Elst || — || align=right | 2.7 km || 
|-id=596 bgcolor=#fefefe
| 13596 ||  || — || August 10, 1994 || La Silla || E. W. Elst || V || align=right | 3.2 km || 
|-id=597 bgcolor=#fefefe
| 13597 ||  || — || August 12, 1994 || La Silla || E. W. Elst || NYS || align=right | 1.9 km || 
|-id=598 bgcolor=#fefefe
| 13598 ||  || — || August 12, 1994 || La Silla || E. W. Elst || NYS || align=right | 2.9 km || 
|-id=599 bgcolor=#E9E9E9
| 13599 Lisbon ||  ||  || August 12, 1994 || La Silla || E. W. Elst || — || align=right | 3.4 km || 
|-id=600 bgcolor=#fefefe
| 13600 ||  || — || August 12, 1994 || La Silla || E. W. Elst || — || align=right | 3.4 km || 
|}

13601–13700 

|-bgcolor=#E9E9E9
| 13601 ||  || — || August 12, 1994 || La Silla || E. W. Elst || — || align=right | 3.8 km || 
|-id=602 bgcolor=#E9E9E9
| 13602 Pierreboulez ||  ||  || August 10, 1994 || La Silla || E. W. Elst || — || align=right | 3.0 km || 
|-id=603 bgcolor=#fefefe
| 13603 ||  || — || August 10, 1994 || La Silla || E. W. Elst || NYS || align=right | 2.7 km || 
|-id=604 bgcolor=#fefefe
| 13604 ||  || — || August 10, 1994 || La Silla || E. W. Elst || — || align=right | 5.1 km || 
|-id=605 bgcolor=#fefefe
| 13605 Nakamuraminoru || 1994 RV ||  || September 1, 1994 || Kitami || K. Endate, K. Watanabe || V || align=right | 4.0 km || 
|-id=606 bgcolor=#fefefe
| 13606 Bean ||  ||  || September 11, 1994 || Kitt Peak || Spacewatch || — || align=right | 2.5 km || 
|-id=607 bgcolor=#fefefe
| 13607 Vicars ||  ||  || September 29, 1994 || Kitt Peak || Spacewatch || V || align=right | 3.8 km || 
|-id=608 bgcolor=#fefefe
| 13608 Andosatoru ||  ||  || October 2, 1994 || Kitami || K. Endate, K. Watanabe || fast? || align=right | 4.4 km || 
|-id=609 bgcolor=#fefefe
| 13609 Lewicki ||  ||  || October 10, 1994 || Kitt Peak || Spacewatch || — || align=right | 4.1 km || 
|-id=610 bgcolor=#fefefe
| 13610 Lilienthal ||  ||  || October 5, 1994 || Tautenburg Observatory || F. Börngen || V || align=right | 3.6 km || 
|-id=611 bgcolor=#E9E9E9
| 13611 ||  || — || October 25, 1994 || Kushiro || S. Ueda, H. Kaneda || — || align=right | 4.2 km || 
|-id=612 bgcolor=#E9E9E9
| 13612 ||  || — || October 25, 1994 || Kushiro || S. Ueda, H. Kaneda || — || align=right | 3.6 km || 
|-id=613 bgcolor=#E9E9E9
| 13613 ||  || — || October 26, 1994 || Kushiro || S. Ueda, H. Kaneda || MIS || align=right | 6.4 km || 
|-id=614 bgcolor=#E9E9E9
| 13614 ||  || — || November 8, 1994 || Kiyosato || S. Otomo || MIT || align=right | 11 km || 
|-id=615 bgcolor=#E9E9E9
| 13615 Manulis ||  ||  || November 28, 1994 || Palomar || C. S. Shoemaker, D. H. Levy || — || align=right | 5.5 km || 
|-id=616 bgcolor=#E9E9E9
| 13616 ||  || — || December 7, 1994 || Oizumi || T. Kobayashi || — || align=right | 6.0 km || 
|-id=617 bgcolor=#E9E9E9
| 13617 ||  || — || December 29, 1994 || Catalina Station || T. B. Spahr || HNS || align=right | 5.7 km || 
|-id=618 bgcolor=#d6d6d6
| 13618 ||  || — || January 30, 1995 || Oizumi || T. Kobayashi || EMA || align=right | 11 km || 
|-id=619 bgcolor=#d6d6d6
| 13619 ||  || — || February 22, 1995 || Oizumi || T. Kobayashi || — || align=right | 12 km || 
|-id=620 bgcolor=#d6d6d6
| 13620 Moynahan ||  ||  || March 23, 1995 || Kitt Peak || Spacewatch || — || align=right | 9.5 km || 
|-id=621 bgcolor=#d6d6d6
| 13621 ||  || — || April 1, 1995 || Nachi-Katsuura || Y. Shimizu, T. Urata || EOS || align=right | 9.3 km || 
|-id=622 bgcolor=#d6d6d6
| 13622 McArthur ||  ||  || April 26, 1995 || Kitt Peak || Spacewatch || — || align=right | 9.6 km || 
|-id=623 bgcolor=#fefefe
| 13623 || 1995 TD || — || October 3, 1995 || Sudbury || D. di Cicco || — || align=right | 2.6 km || 
|-id=624 bgcolor=#fefefe
| 13624 Abeosamu ||  ||  || October 17, 1995 || Nanyo || T. Okuni || FLO || align=right | 2.7 km || 
|-id=625 bgcolor=#fefefe
| 13625 ||  || — || October 20, 1995 || Oizumi || T. Kobayashi || FLO || align=right | 3.2 km || 
|-id=626 bgcolor=#fefefe
| 13626 ||  || — || October 20, 1995 || Oizumi || T. Kobayashi || — || align=right | 2.6 km || 
|-id=627 bgcolor=#fefefe
| 13627 Yukitamayo ||  ||  || November 15, 1995 || Kitami || K. Endate, K. Watanabe || — || align=right | 3.4 km || 
|-id=628 bgcolor=#fefefe
| 13628 || 1995 WE || — || November 16, 1995 || Oizumi || T. Kobayashi || — || align=right | 4.5 km || 
|-id=629 bgcolor=#fefefe
| 13629 ||  || — || November 18, 1995 || Oizumi || T. Kobayashi || — || align=right | 3.2 km || 
|-id=630 bgcolor=#fefefe
| 13630 ||  || — || November 21, 1995 || Farra d'Isonzo || Farra d'Isonzo || NYS || align=right | 2.5 km || 
|-id=631 bgcolor=#fefefe
| 13631 ||  || — || November 24, 1995 || Oizumi || T. Kobayashi || — || align=right | 2.9 km || 
|-id=632 bgcolor=#fefefe
| 13632 ||  || — || November 18, 1995 || Kushiro || S. Ueda, H. Kaneda || — || align=right | 3.6 km || 
|-id=633 bgcolor=#fefefe
| 13633 Ivens ||  ||  || November 17, 1995 || Kitt Peak || Spacewatch || — || align=right | 2.3 km || 
|-id=634 bgcolor=#fefefe
| 13634 ||  || — || November 16, 1995 || Kushiro || S. Ueda, H. Kaneda || — || align=right | 2.7 km || 
|-id=635 bgcolor=#fefefe
| 13635 ||  || — || November 22, 1995 || Harvard Observatory || Oak Ridge Observatory || — || align=right | 2.7 km || 
|-id=636 bgcolor=#fefefe
| 13636 ||  || — || December 22, 1995 || Oohira || T. Urata || MAS || align=right | 2.1 km || 
|-id=637 bgcolor=#fefefe
| 13637 ||  || — || December 27, 1995 || Oizumi || T. Kobayashi || MAS || align=right | 3.3 km || 
|-id=638 bgcolor=#fefefe
| 13638 Fiorenza ||  ||  || February 14, 1996 || Cima Ekar || M. Tombelli, U. Munari || V || align=right | 3.7 km || 
|-id=639 bgcolor=#E9E9E9
| 13639 ||  || — || March 10, 1996 || Kushiro || S. Ueda, H. Kaneda || — || align=right | 9.2 km || 
|-id=640 bgcolor=#E9E9E9
| 13640 Ohtateruaki ||  ||  || April 12, 1996 || Kitami || K. Endate, K. Watanabe || EUN || align=right | 4.4 km || 
|-id=641 bgcolor=#d6d6d6
| 13641 de Lesseps ||  ||  || April 15, 1996 || La Silla || E. W. Elst || — || align=right | 10 km || 
|-id=642 bgcolor=#d6d6d6
| 13642 Ricci || 1996 HX ||  || April 19, 1996 || Prescott || P. G. Comba || — || align=right | 9.8 km || 
|-id=643 bgcolor=#E9E9E9
| 13643 Takushi ||  ||  || April 21, 1996 || Yatsuka || H. Abe || EUN || align=right | 8.4 km || 
|-id=644 bgcolor=#d6d6d6
| 13644 Lynnanderson ||  ||  || April 17, 1996 || La Silla || E. W. Elst || THM || align=right | 9.2 km || 
|-id=645 bgcolor=#d6d6d6
| 13645 ||  || — || April 17, 1996 || La Silla || E. W. Elst || — || align=right | 7.9 km || 
|-id=646 bgcolor=#d6d6d6
| 13646 ||  || — || April 17, 1996 || La Silla || E. W. Elst || KOR || align=right | 3.8 km || 
|-id=647 bgcolor=#d6d6d6
| 13647 Rey ||  ||  || April 20, 1996 || La Silla || E. W. Elst || — || align=right | 8.3 km || 
|-id=648 bgcolor=#d6d6d6
| 13648 ||  || — || May 15, 1996 || Haleakala || NEAT || EOS || align=right | 7.4 km || 
|-id=649 bgcolor=#d6d6d6
| 13649 ||  || — || August 12, 1996 || Haleakala || NEAT || THM || align=right | 12 km || 
|-id=650 bgcolor=#C2FFFF
| 13650 Perimedes ||  ||  || October 4, 1996 || La Silla || E. W. Elst || L4 || align=right | 22 km || 
|-id=651 bgcolor=#FFC2E0
| 13651 || 1997 BR || — || January 20, 1997 || Xinglong || SCAP || APO +1kmPHA || align=right data-sort-value="0.56" | 560 m || 
|-id=652 bgcolor=#fefefe
| 13652 Elowitz ||  ||  || January 31, 1997 || Kitt Peak || Spacewatch || FLO || align=right | 2.1 km || 
|-id=653 bgcolor=#fefefe
| 13653 Priscus ||  ||  || February 9, 1997 || Colleverde || V. S. Casulli || — || align=right | 1.9 km || 
|-id=654 bgcolor=#fefefe
| 13654 Masuda ||  ||  || February 9, 1997 || Chichibu || N. Satō || — || align=right | 2.2 km || 
|-id=655 bgcolor=#fefefe
| 13655 ||  || — || March 4, 1997 || Oizumi || T. Kobayashi || — || align=right | 3.7 km || 
|-id=656 bgcolor=#E9E9E9
| 13656 ||  || — || March 15, 1997 || Xinglong || SCAP || — || align=right | 3.1 km || 
|-id=657 bgcolor=#fefefe
| 13657 Badinter ||  ||  || March 8, 1997 || La Silla || E. W. Elst || NYS || align=right | 3.9 km || 
|-id=658 bgcolor=#fefefe
| 13658 Sylvester || 1997 FB ||  || March 18, 1997 || Prescott || P. G. Comba || — || align=right | 2.3 km || 
|-id=659 bgcolor=#fefefe
| 13659 ||  || — || March 31, 1997 || Socorro || LINEAR || — || align=right | 2.8 km || 
|-id=660 bgcolor=#fefefe
| 13660 ||  || — || April 2, 1997 || Socorro || LINEAR || MAS || align=right | 2.1 km || 
|-id=661 bgcolor=#fefefe
| 13661 ||  || — || April 2, 1997 || Socorro || LINEAR || — || align=right | 3.8 km || 
|-id=662 bgcolor=#fefefe
| 13662 ||  || — || April 3, 1997 || Socorro || LINEAR || — || align=right | 2.9 km || 
|-id=663 bgcolor=#fefefe
| 13663 ||  || — || April 3, 1997 || Socorro || LINEAR || NYS || align=right | 2.9 km || 
|-id=664 bgcolor=#fefefe
| 13664 ||  || — || April 3, 1997 || Socorro || LINEAR || — || align=right | 1.7 km || 
|-id=665 bgcolor=#fefefe
| 13665 ||  || — || April 3, 1997 || Socorro || LINEAR || — || align=right | 2.5 km || 
|-id=666 bgcolor=#fefefe
| 13666 ||  || — || April 6, 1997 || Socorro || LINEAR || MAS || align=right | 2.6 km || 
|-id=667 bgcolor=#fefefe
| 13667 Samthurman ||  ||  || April 5, 1997 || Haleakala || NEAT || NYS || align=right | 2.5 km || 
|-id=668 bgcolor=#fefefe
| 13668 Tanner ||  ||  || April 28, 1997 || Kitt Peak || Spacewatch || FLO || align=right | 2.5 km || 
|-id=669 bgcolor=#E9E9E9
| 13669 Swammerdam ||  ||  || May 3, 1997 || La Silla || E. W. Elst || — || align=right | 2.4 km || 
|-id=670 bgcolor=#fefefe
| 13670 ||  || — || May 3, 1997 || La Silla || E. W. Elst || — || align=right | 3.0 km || 
|-id=671 bgcolor=#E9E9E9
| 13671 ||  || — || May 3, 1997 || La Silla || E. W. Elst || — || align=right | 2.8 km || 
|-id=672 bgcolor=#E9E9E9
| 13672 Tarski || 1997 KH ||  || May 30, 1997 || Prescott || P. G. Comba || — || align=right | 4.8 km || 
|-id=673 bgcolor=#d6d6d6
| 13673 Urysohn || 1997 LC ||  || June 1, 1997 || Prescott || P. G. Comba || KOR || align=right | 3.6 km || 
|-id=674 bgcolor=#fefefe
| 13674 Bourge ||  ||  || June 30, 1997 || Caussols || ODAS || V || align=right | 2.8 km || 
|-id=675 bgcolor=#E9E9E9
| 13675 ||  || — || June 28, 1997 || Socorro || LINEAR || — || align=right | 5.9 km || 
|-id=676 bgcolor=#d6d6d6
| 13676 ||  || — || June 28, 1997 || Socorro || LINEAR || KOR || align=right | 5.0 km || 
|-id=677 bgcolor=#d6d6d6
| 13677 Alvin ||  ||  || July 2, 1997 || Kitt Peak || Spacewatch || — || align=right | 9.1 km || 
|-id=678 bgcolor=#E9E9E9
| 13678 Shimada ||  ||  || July 6, 1997 || Nanyo || T. Okuni || — || align=right | 8.2 km || 
|-id=679 bgcolor=#E9E9E9
| 13679 Shinanogawa ||  ||  || July 29, 1997 || Nanyo || T. Okuni || MAR || align=right | 5.7 km || 
|-id=680 bgcolor=#d6d6d6
| 13680 Katyafrantseva || 1997 PY ||  || August 4, 1997 || Caussols || ODAS || KOR || align=right | 3.9 km || 
|-id=681 bgcolor=#d6d6d6
| 13681 Monty Python ||  ||  || August 7, 1997 || Kleť || M. Tichý, Z. Moravec || EOS || align=right | 6.2 km || 
|-id=682 bgcolor=#d6d6d6
| 13682 Pressberger ||  ||  || August 10, 1997 || Linz || E. Meyer, H. Raab || — || align=right | 8.6 km || 
|-id=683 bgcolor=#d6d6d6
| 13683 ||  || — || August 8, 1997 || Xinglong || SCAP || EOS || align=right | 7.0 km || 
|-id=684 bgcolor=#d6d6d6
| 13684 Borbona ||  ||  || August 27, 1997 || Colleverde || V. S. Casulli || — || align=right | 17 km || 
|-id=685 bgcolor=#d6d6d6
| 13685 ||  || — || August 27, 1997 || Nachi-Katsuura || Y. Shimizu, T. Urata || — || align=right | 8.0 km || 
|-id=686 bgcolor=#d6d6d6
| 13686 Kongozan ||  ||  || August 30, 1997 || Nanyo || T. Okuni || THM || align=right | 11 km || 
|-id=687 bgcolor=#d6d6d6
| 13687 ||  || — || September 7, 1997 || Church Stretton || S. P. Laurie || — || align=right | 17 km || 
|-id=688 bgcolor=#d6d6d6
| 13688 Oklahoma ||  ||  || September 9, 1997 || Zeno || T. Stafford || — || align=right | 7.0 km || 
|-id=689 bgcolor=#d6d6d6
| 13689 Succi ||  ||  || September 9, 1997 || Sormano || V. Giuliani || VER || align=right | 9.0 km || 
|-id=690 bgcolor=#d6d6d6
| 13690 Lesleymartin ||  ||  || September 8, 1997 || Uccle || T. Pauwels || TIR || align=right | 14 km || 
|-id=691 bgcolor=#E9E9E9
| 13691 Akie ||  ||  || September 30, 1997 || Hadano Obs. || A. Asami || — || align=right | 5.5 km || 
|-id=692 bgcolor=#E9E9E9
| 13692 ||  || — || September 27, 1997 || Črni Vrh || H. Mikuž || — || align=right | 7.4 km || 
|-id=693 bgcolor=#E9E9E9
| 13693 Bondar ||  ||  || October 4, 1997 || Kitt Peak || Spacewatch || — || align=right | 4.1 km || 
|-id=694 bgcolor=#C2FFFF
| 13694 ||  || — || November 23, 1997 || Chichibu || N. Satō || L4 || align=right | 29 km || 
|-id=695 bgcolor=#E9E9E9
| 13695 ||  || — || March 20, 1998 || Socorro || LINEAR || ADE || align=right | 7.4 km || 
|-id=696 bgcolor=#fefefe
| 13696 ||  || — || April 20, 1998 || Socorro || LINEAR || FLO || align=right | 3.9 km || 
|-id=697 bgcolor=#fefefe
| 13697 ||  || — || April 19, 1998 || Socorro || LINEAR || — || align=right | 4.3 km || 
|-id=698 bgcolor=#fefefe
| 13698 ||  || — || May 22, 1998 || Socorro || LINEAR || V || align=right | 5.3 km || 
|-id=699 bgcolor=#fefefe
| 13699 Nickthomas ||  ||  || June 18, 1998 || Anderson Mesa || LONEOS || FLO || align=right | 3.8 km || 
|-id=700 bgcolor=#fefefe
| 13700 Connors ||  ||  || June 26, 1998 || Kitt Peak || Spacewatch || — || align=right | 2.9 km || 
|}

13701–13800 

|-bgcolor=#fefefe
| 13701 Roquebrune || 1998 OR ||  || July 20, 1998 || Caussols || ODAS || — || align=right | 2.2 km || 
|-id=702 bgcolor=#E9E9E9
| 13702 ||  || — || July 28, 1998 || Xinglong || SCAP || — || align=right | 4.7 km || 
|-id=703 bgcolor=#fefefe
| 13703 Romero ||  ||  || July 26, 1998 || La Silla || E. W. Elst || MAS || align=right | 3.6 km || 
|-id=704 bgcolor=#d6d6d6
| 13704 Aletesi ||  ||  || August 13, 1998 || San Marcello || L. Tesi || — || align=right | 9.6 km || 
|-id=705 bgcolor=#fefefe
| 13705 Llapasset ||  ||  || August 19, 1998 || Bédoin || Bédoin Obs. || — || align=right | 2.8 km || 
|-id=706 bgcolor=#fefefe
| 13706 ||  || — || August 17, 1998 || Socorro || LINEAR || — || align=right | 3.7 km || 
|-id=707 bgcolor=#E9E9E9
| 13707 ||  || — || August 17, 1998 || Socorro || LINEAR || — || align=right | 5.5 km || 
|-id=708 bgcolor=#fefefe
| 13708 ||  || — || August 17, 1998 || Socorro || LINEAR || — || align=right | 3.6 km || 
|-id=709 bgcolor=#fefefe
| 13709 ||  || — || August 17, 1998 || Socorro || LINEAR || — || align=right | 3.8 km || 
|-id=710 bgcolor=#fefefe
| 13710 Shridhar ||  ||  || August 17, 1998 || Socorro || LINEAR || — || align=right | 2.6 km || 
|-id=711 bgcolor=#fefefe
| 13711 ||  || — || August 25, 1998 || Višnjan Observatory || Višnjan Obs. || NYS || align=right | 2.8 km || 
|-id=712 bgcolor=#fefefe
| 13712 ||  || — || August 23, 1998 || Višnjan Observatory || Višnjan Obs. || — || align=right | 3.9 km || 
|-id=713 bgcolor=#fefefe
| 13713 ||  || — || August 23, 1998 || Višnjan Observatory || Višnjan Obs. || — || align=right | 2.8 km || 
|-id=714 bgcolor=#fefefe
| 13714 Stainbrook ||  ||  || August 17, 1998 || Socorro || LINEAR || FLO || align=right | 3.1 km || 
|-id=715 bgcolor=#E9E9E9
| 13715 Steed ||  ||  || August 17, 1998 || Socorro || LINEAR || — || align=right | 5.0 km || 
|-id=716 bgcolor=#fefefe
| 13716 Trevino ||  ||  || August 17, 1998 || Socorro || LINEAR || V || align=right | 3.5 km || 
|-id=717 bgcolor=#fefefe
| 13717 Vencill ||  ||  || August 17, 1998 || Socorro || LINEAR || — || align=right | 2.5 km || 
|-id=718 bgcolor=#fefefe
| 13718 Welcker ||  ||  || August 17, 1998 || Socorro || LINEAR || — || align=right | 2.1 km || 
|-id=719 bgcolor=#fefefe
| 13719 ||  || — || August 17, 1998 || Socorro || LINEAR || — || align=right | 2.8 km || 
|-id=720 bgcolor=#d6d6d6
| 13720 ||  || — || August 17, 1998 || Socorro || LINEAR || ALA || align=right | 12 km || 
|-id=721 bgcolor=#fefefe
| 13721 Kevinwelsh ||  ||  || August 17, 1998 || Socorro || LINEAR || — || align=right | 1.9 km || 
|-id=722 bgcolor=#E9E9E9
| 13722 Campobagatin ||  ||  || August 27, 1998 || Anderson Mesa || LONEOS || — || align=right | 7.2 km || 
|-id=723 bgcolor=#E9E9E9
| 13723 Kolokolova ||  ||  || August 27, 1998 || Anderson Mesa || LONEOS || MRX || align=right | 4.3 km || 
|-id=724 bgcolor=#fefefe
| 13724 Schwehm ||  ||  || August 27, 1998 || Anderson Mesa || LONEOS || NYS || align=right | 3.4 km || 
|-id=725 bgcolor=#d6d6d6
| 13725 ||  || — || August 29, 1998 || Višnjan Observatory || Višnjan Obs. || KOR || align=right | 5.3 km || 
|-id=726 bgcolor=#d6d6d6
| 13726 ||  || — || August 24, 1998 || Socorro || LINEAR || EOS || align=right | 8.9 km || 
|-id=727 bgcolor=#fefefe
| 13727 ||  || — || August 28, 1998 || Socorro || LINEAR || — || align=right | 4.8 km || 
|-id=728 bgcolor=#fefefe
| 13728 ||  || — || August 28, 1998 || Socorro || LINEAR || — || align=right | 5.0 km || 
|-id=729 bgcolor=#fefefe
| 13729 Nicolewen ||  ||  || September 14, 1998 || Socorro || LINEAR || — || align=right | 3.2 km || 
|-id=730 bgcolor=#fefefe
| 13730 Willis ||  ||  || September 14, 1998 || Socorro || LINEAR || V || align=right | 2.7 km || 
|-id=731 bgcolor=#fefefe
| 13731 ||  || — || September 14, 1998 || Socorro || LINEAR || — || align=right | 2.2 km || 
|-id=732 bgcolor=#fefefe
| 13732 Woodall ||  ||  || September 14, 1998 || Socorro || LINEAR || V || align=right | 2.9 km || 
|-id=733 bgcolor=#fefefe
| 13733 Dylanyoung ||  ||  || September 14, 1998 || Socorro || LINEAR || — || align=right | 3.6 km || 
|-id=734 bgcolor=#fefefe
| 13734 Buklad ||  ||  || September 14, 1998 || Socorro || LINEAR || FLO || align=right | 2.5 km || 
|-id=735 bgcolor=#d6d6d6
| 13735 ||  || — || September 14, 1998 || Socorro || LINEAR || — || align=right | 7.1 km || 
|-id=736 bgcolor=#d6d6d6
| 13736 ||  || — || September 14, 1998 || Socorro || LINEAR || — || align=right | 7.2 km || 
|-id=737 bgcolor=#fefefe
| 13737 ||  || — || September 14, 1998 || Socorro || LINEAR || ERI || align=right | 9.1 km || 
|-id=738 bgcolor=#fefefe
| 13738 ||  || — || September 16, 1998 || Caussols || ODAS || — || align=right | 2.8 km || 
|-id=739 bgcolor=#d6d6d6
| 13739 Nancyworden ||  ||  || September 16, 1998 || Caussols || ODAS || EOS || align=right | 13 km || 
|-id=740 bgcolor=#E9E9E9
| 13740 Lastrucci ||  ||  || September 18, 1998 || Montelupo || M. Tombelli, E. Masotti || — || align=right | 4.1 km || 
|-id=741 bgcolor=#E9E9E9
| 13741 ||  || — || September 17, 1998 || Caussols || ODAS || AST || align=right | 11 km || 
|-id=742 bgcolor=#E9E9E9
| 13742 ||  || — || September 23, 1998 || Woomera || F. B. Zoltowski || MRX || align=right | 3.4 km || 
|-id=743 bgcolor=#fefefe
| 13743 Rivkin ||  ||  || September 17, 1998 || Anderson Mesa || LONEOS || — || align=right | 2.3 km || 
|-id=744 bgcolor=#E9E9E9
| 13744 Rickline ||  ||  || September 22, 1998 || Anderson Mesa || LONEOS || PAD || align=right | 11 km || 
|-id=745 bgcolor=#E9E9E9
| 13745 Mikecosta ||  ||  || September 28, 1998 || Kitt Peak || Spacewatch || — || align=right | 3.7 km || 
|-id=746 bgcolor=#d6d6d6
| 13746 ||  || — || September 25, 1998 || Xinglong || SCAP || KOR || align=right | 4.4 km || 
|-id=747 bgcolor=#E9E9E9
| 13747 ||  || — || September 25, 1998 || Xinglong || SCAP || — || align=right | 6.4 km || 
|-id=748 bgcolor=#d6d6d6
| 13748 Radaly ||  ||  || September 25, 1998 || Kitt Peak || Spacewatch || — || align=right | 10 km || 
|-id=749 bgcolor=#E9E9E9
| 13749 ||  || — || September 24, 1998 || Višnjan Observatory || Višnjan Obs. || GEF || align=right | 6.8 km || 
|-id=750 bgcolor=#fefefe
| 13750 Mattdawson ||  ||  || September 16, 1998 || Anderson Mesa || LONEOS || V || align=right | 3.2 km || 
|-id=751 bgcolor=#fefefe
| 13751 Joelparker ||  ||  || September 16, 1998 || Anderson Mesa || LONEOS || — || align=right | 2.5 km || 
|-id=752 bgcolor=#fefefe
| 13752 Grantstokes ||  ||  || September 17, 1998 || Anderson Mesa || LONEOS || — || align=right | 3.0 km || 
|-id=753 bgcolor=#d6d6d6
| 13753 Jennivirta ||  ||  || September 17, 1998 || Anderson Mesa || LONEOS || HYG || align=right | 8.4 km || 
|-id=754 bgcolor=#E9E9E9
| 13754 ||  || — || September 25, 1998 || Xinglong || SCAP || HNS || align=right | 10 km || 
|-id=755 bgcolor=#d6d6d6
| 13755 ||  || — || September 21, 1998 || La Silla || E. W. Elst || — || align=right | 6.1 km || 
|-id=756 bgcolor=#d6d6d6
| 13756 ||  || — || September 21, 1998 || La Silla || E. W. Elst || KOR || align=right | 3.4 km || 
|-id=757 bgcolor=#fefefe
| 13757 ||  || — || September 21, 1998 || La Silla || E. W. Elst || — || align=right | 6.5 km || 
|-id=758 bgcolor=#E9E9E9
| 13758 ||  || — || September 21, 1998 || La Silla || E. W. Elst || — || align=right | 4.1 km || 
|-id=759 bgcolor=#d6d6d6
| 13759 ||  || — || September 26, 1998 || Socorro || LINEAR || — || align=right | 12 km || 
|-id=760 bgcolor=#E9E9E9
| 13760 Rodriguez ||  ||  || September 26, 1998 || Socorro || LINEAR || — || align=right | 4.2 km || 
|-id=761 bgcolor=#fefefe
| 13761 Dorristaylor ||  ||  || September 26, 1998 || Socorro || LINEAR || NYS || align=right | 3.1 km || 
|-id=762 bgcolor=#fefefe
| 13762 ||  || — || September 26, 1998 || Socorro || LINEAR || — || align=right | 3.3 km || 
|-id=763 bgcolor=#d6d6d6
| 13763 ||  || — || September 26, 1998 || Socorro || LINEAR || — || align=right | 7.9 km || 
|-id=764 bgcolor=#fefefe
| 13764 Mcalanis ||  ||  || September 26, 1998 || Socorro || LINEAR || — || align=right | 2.3 km || 
|-id=765 bgcolor=#d6d6d6
| 13765 Nansmith ||  ||  || September 26, 1998 || Socorro || LINEAR || KAR || align=right | 3.5 km || 
|-id=766 bgcolor=#fefefe
| 13766 Bonham ||  ||  || September 26, 1998 || Socorro || LINEAR || FLO || align=right | 2.9 km || 
|-id=767 bgcolor=#E9E9E9
| 13767 ||  || — || September 26, 1998 || Socorro || LINEAR || — || align=right | 4.6 km || 
|-id=768 bgcolor=#d6d6d6
| 13768 ||  || — || September 18, 1998 || La Silla || E. W. Elst || KOR || align=right | 3.5 km || 
|-id=769 bgcolor=#E9E9E9
| 13769 ||  || — || September 20, 1998 || La Silla || E. W. Elst || — || align=right | 3.8 km || 
|-id=770 bgcolor=#d6d6d6
| 13770 Commerson ||  ||  || September 20, 1998 || La Silla || E. W. Elst || — || align=right | 4.4 km || 
|-id=771 bgcolor=#d6d6d6
| 13771 ||  || — || September 26, 1998 || Socorro || LINEAR || — || align=right | 4.6 km || 
|-id=772 bgcolor=#d6d6d6
| 13772 Livius ||  ||  || September 18, 1998 || La Silla || E. W. Elst || EOS || align=right | 9.5 km || 
|-id=773 bgcolor=#E9E9E9
| 13773 ||  || — || October 14, 1998 || Višnjan Observatory || K. Korlević || — || align=right | 5.3 km || 
|-id=774 bgcolor=#d6d6d6
| 13774 Spurný ||  ||  || October 10, 1998 || Anderson Mesa || LONEOS || — || align=right | 6.0 km || 
|-id=775 bgcolor=#E9E9E9
| 13775 Thébault ||  ||  || October 11, 1998 || Anderson Mesa || LONEOS || — || align=right | 8.8 km || 
|-id=776 bgcolor=#d6d6d6
| 13776 ||  || — || October 19, 1998 || Woomera || F. B. Zoltowski || — || align=right | 7.8 km || 
|-id=777 bgcolor=#d6d6d6
| 13777 Cielobuio ||  ||  || October 20, 1998 || Sormano || M. Cavagna, A. Testa || KOR || align=right | 4.7 km || 
|-id=778 bgcolor=#E9E9E9
| 13778 ||  || — || October 22, 1998 || Višnjan Observatory || K. Korlević || — || align=right | 3.7 km || 
|-id=779 bgcolor=#E9E9E9
| 13779 ||  || — || October 23, 1998 || Višnjan Observatory || K. Korlević || — || align=right | 5.6 km || 
|-id=780 bgcolor=#C2FFFF
| 13780 ||  || — || October 17, 1998 || Xinglong || SCAP || L4 || align=right | 22 km || 
|-id=781 bgcolor=#fefefe
| 13781 ||  || — || October 23, 1998 || Višnjan Observatory || K. Korlević || — || align=right | 3.0 km || 
|-id=782 bgcolor=#C2FFFF
| 13782 ||  || — || October 28, 1998 || Catalina || CSS || L4 || align=right | 25 km || 
|-id=783 bgcolor=#fefefe
| 13783 ||  || — || October 20, 1998 || Kushiro || S. Ueda, H. Kaneda || — || align=right | 3.6 km || 
|-id=784 bgcolor=#fefefe
| 13784 ||  || — || October 23, 1998 || Višnjan Observatory || K. Korlević || — || align=right | 3.9 km || 
|-id=785 bgcolor=#d6d6d6
| 13785 ||  || — || October 29, 1998 || Višnjan Observatory || K. Korlević || — || align=right | 4.8 km || 
|-id=786 bgcolor=#E9E9E9
| 13786 ||  || — || October 29, 1998 || Višnjan Observatory || K. Korlević || — || align=right | 6.2 km || 
|-id=787 bgcolor=#d6d6d6
| 13787 Nagaishi ||  ||  || October 26, 1998 || Nanyo || T. Okuni || THM || align=right | 11 km || 
|-id=788 bgcolor=#E9E9E9
| 13788 Dansolander ||  ||  || October 18, 1998 || La Silla || E. W. Elst || CLO || align=right | 8.2 km || 
|-id=789 bgcolor=#fefefe
| 13789 ||  || — || October 18, 1998 || La Silla || E. W. Elst || V || align=right | 4.0 km || 
|-id=790 bgcolor=#C2FFFF
| 13790 ||  || — || October 17, 1998 || Xinglong || SCAP || L4 || align=right | 19 km || 
|-id=791 bgcolor=#fefefe
| 13791 || 1998 VC || — || November 1, 1998 || Gekko || T. Kagawa || NYS || align=right | 3.5 km || 
|-id=792 bgcolor=#d6d6d6
| 13792 Kuščynskyj || 1998 VG ||  || November 7, 1998 || Kleť || J. Tichá, M. Tichý || — || align=right | 11 km || 
|-id=793 bgcolor=#d6d6d6
| 13793 Laubernasconi ||  ||  || November 11, 1998 || Caussols || ODAS || — || align=right | 8.7 km || 
|-id=794 bgcolor=#d6d6d6
| 13794 ||  || — || November 11, 1998 || Višnjan Observatory || K. Korlević || THM || align=right | 10 km || 
|-id=795 bgcolor=#d6d6d6
| 13795 ||  || — || November 10, 1998 || Socorro || LINEAR || THM || align=right | 12 km || 
|-id=796 bgcolor=#d6d6d6
| 13796 ||  || — || November 10, 1998 || Socorro || LINEAR || THM || align=right | 9.1 km || 
|-id=797 bgcolor=#d6d6d6
| 13797 ||  || — || November 10, 1998 || Socorro || LINEAR || KOR || align=right | 4.4 km || 
|-id=798 bgcolor=#d6d6d6
| 13798 Cecchini ||  ||  || November 15, 1998 || Pian dei Termini || L. Tesi, A. Boattini || — || align=right | 6.7 km || 
|-id=799 bgcolor=#d6d6d6
| 13799 ||  || — || November 14, 1998 || Uenohara || N. Kawasato || KOR || align=right | 3.9 km || 
|-id=800 bgcolor=#E9E9E9
| 13800 ||  || — || November 14, 1998 || Socorro || LINEAR || EUN || align=right | 7.1 km || 
|}

13801–13900 

|-bgcolor=#E9E9E9
| 13801 Kohlhase ||  ||  || November 11, 1998 || Anderson Mesa || LONEOS || GEF || align=right | 5.4 km || 
|-id=802 bgcolor=#fefefe
| 13802 ||  || — || November 18, 1998 || Kushiro || S. Ueda, H. Kaneda || — || align=right | 4.1 km || 
|-id=803 bgcolor=#fefefe
| 13803 ||  || — || November 21, 1998 || Socorro || LINEAR || NYS || align=right | 3.3 km || 
|-id=804 bgcolor=#d6d6d6
| 13804 Hrazany || 1998 XK ||  || December 9, 1998 || Kleť || M. Tichý, Z. Moravec || — || align=right | 13 km || 
|-id=805 bgcolor=#d6d6d6
| 13805 ||  || — || December 9, 1998 || Oizumi || T. Kobayashi || THM || align=right | 11 km || 
|-id=806 bgcolor=#d6d6d6
| 13806 Darmstrong ||  ||  || December 8, 1998 || Kitt Peak || Spacewatch || KOR || align=right | 4.9 km || 
|-id=807 bgcolor=#d6d6d6
| 13807 ||  || — || December 15, 1998 || Caussols || ODAS || KAR || align=right | 4.6 km || 
|-id=808 bgcolor=#d6d6d6
| 13808 Davewilliams ||  ||  || December 11, 1998 || Kitt Peak || Spacewatch || URS || align=right | 23 km || 
|-id=809 bgcolor=#d6d6d6
| 13809 ||  || — || December 14, 1998 || Socorro || LINEAR || — || align=right | 15 km || 
|-id=810 bgcolor=#d6d6d6
| 13810 ||  || — || December 14, 1998 || Socorro || LINEAR || — || align=right | 14 km || 
|-id=811 bgcolor=#d6d6d6
| 13811 ||  || — || December 15, 1998 || Socorro || LINEAR || EOS || align=right | 12 km || 
|-id=812 bgcolor=#d6d6d6
| 13812 || 1998 YR || — || December 16, 1998 || Oizumi || T. Kobayashi || — || align=right | 13 km || 
|-id=813 bgcolor=#d6d6d6
| 13813 || 1998 YX || — || December 16, 1998 || Oizumi || T. Kobayashi || EOS || align=right | 11 km || 
|-id=814 bgcolor=#d6d6d6
| 13814 ||  || — || December 17, 1998 || Oizumi || T. Kobayashi || EOS || align=right | 9.3 km || 
|-id=815 bgcolor=#d6d6d6
| 13815 Furuya ||  ||  || December 22, 1998 || Hadano Obs. || A. Asami || — || align=right | 16 km || 
|-id=816 bgcolor=#E9E9E9
| 13816 Stülpner ||  ||  || December 29, 1998 || Drebach || J. Kandler || EUN || align=right | 4.3 km || 
|-id=817 bgcolor=#d6d6d6
| 13817 Genobechetti ||  ||  || September 8, 1999 || Catalina || CSS || — || align=right | 18 km || 
|-id=818 bgcolor=#E9E9E9
| 13818 Ullery ||  ||  || September 7, 1999 || Socorro || LINEAR || — || align=right | 3.7 km || 
|-id=819 bgcolor=#FA8072
| 13819 ||  || — || September 30, 1999 || Socorro || LINEAR || PHO || align=right | 3.9 km || 
|-id=820 bgcolor=#d6d6d6
| 13820 Schwartz || 1999 VQ ||  || November 1, 1999 || Fountain Hills || C. W. Juels || THM || align=right | 11 km || 
|-id=821 bgcolor=#fefefe
| 13821 ||  || — || November 8, 1999 || Višnjan Observatory || K. Korlević || NYS || align=right | 2.5 km || 
|-id=822 bgcolor=#fefefe
| 13822 Stevedodson ||  ||  || November 2, 1999 || Kitt Peak || Spacewatch || FLO || align=right | 2.2 km || 
|-id=823 bgcolor=#d6d6d6
| 13823 ||  || — || November 15, 1999 || Xinglong || SCAP || EOS || align=right | 11 km || 
|-id=824 bgcolor=#fefefe
| 13824 Kramlik ||  ||  || November 5, 1999 || Socorro || LINEAR || — || align=right | 3.9 km || 
|-id=825 bgcolor=#E9E9E9
| 13825 Booth ||  ||  || November 4, 1999 || Socorro || LINEAR || RAF || align=right | 4.1 km || 
|-id=826 bgcolor=#fefefe
| 13826 || 1999 WM || — || November 16, 1999 || Oizumi || T. Kobayashi || — || align=right | 3.3 km || 
|-id=827 bgcolor=#fefefe
| 13827 ||  || — || November 28, 1999 || Oizumi || T. Kobayashi || — || align=right | 3.7 km || 
|-id=828 bgcolor=#d6d6d6
| 13828 ||  || — || November 28, 1999 || Višnjan Observatory || K. Korlević || KOR || align=right | 3.4 km || 
|-id=829 bgcolor=#d6d6d6
| 13829 ||  || — || November 29, 1999 || Višnjan Observatory || K. Korlević || THM || align=right | 10 km || 
|-id=830 bgcolor=#E9E9E9
| 13830 ARLT ||  ||  || December 4, 1999 || Fountain Hills || C. W. Juels || AGN || align=right | 5.9 km || 
|-id=831 bgcolor=#fefefe
| 13831 ||  || — || December 3, 1999 || Oizumi || T. Kobayashi || FLO || align=right | 2.9 km || 
|-id=832 bgcolor=#d6d6d6
| 13832 ||  || — || December 5, 1999 || Socorro || LINEAR || 7:4 || align=right | 38 km || 
|-id=833 bgcolor=#d6d6d6
| 13833 ||  || — || December 5, 1999 || Socorro || LINEAR || EOS || align=right | 12 km || 
|-id=834 bgcolor=#E9E9E9
| 13834 ||  || — || December 3, 1999 || Socorro || LINEAR || — || align=right | 4.9 km || 
|-id=835 bgcolor=#d6d6d6
| 13835 ||  || — || December 5, 1999 || Socorro || LINEAR || KOR || align=right | 5.5 km || 
|-id=836 bgcolor=#E9E9E9
| 13836 ||  || — || December 6, 1999 || Socorro || LINEAR || EUN || align=right | 7.7 km || 
|-id=837 bgcolor=#d6d6d6
| 13837 ||  || — || December 6, 1999 || Socorro || LINEAR || — || align=right | 6.8 km || 
|-id=838 bgcolor=#d6d6d6
| 13838 ||  || — || December 6, 1999 || Socorro || LINEAR || — || align=right | 8.3 km || 
|-id=839 bgcolor=#fefefe
| 13839 ||  || — || December 6, 1999 || Socorro || LINEAR || — || align=right | 5.9 km || 
|-id=840 bgcolor=#fefefe
| 13840 Wayneanderson ||  ||  || December 6, 1999 || Socorro || LINEAR || NYS || align=right | 4.6 km || 
|-id=841 bgcolor=#fefefe
| 13841 Blankenship ||  ||  || December 6, 1999 || Socorro || LINEAR || MAS || align=right | 3.4 km || 
|-id=842 bgcolor=#E9E9E9
| 13842 ||  || — || December 6, 1999 || Socorro || LINEAR || — || align=right | 14 km || 
|-id=843 bgcolor=#fefefe
| 13843 Cowenbrown ||  ||  || December 6, 1999 || Socorro || LINEAR || — || align=right | 2.5 km || 
|-id=844 bgcolor=#fefefe
| 13844 ||  || — || December 6, 1999 || Socorro || LINEAR || FLO || align=right | 4.0 km || 
|-id=845 bgcolor=#d6d6d6
| 13845 Jillburnett ||  ||  || December 7, 1999 || Socorro || LINEAR || THM || align=right | 6.2 km || 
|-id=846 bgcolor=#fefefe
| 13846 ||  || — || December 7, 1999 || Socorro || LINEAR || NYS || align=right | 3.9 km || 
|-id=847 bgcolor=#fefefe
| 13847 ||  || — || December 7, 1999 || Socorro || LINEAR || — || align=right | 3.3 km || 
|-id=848 bgcolor=#fefefe
| 13848 Cioffi ||  ||  || December 7, 1999 || Socorro || LINEAR || FLO || align=right | 3.6 km || 
|-id=849 bgcolor=#fefefe
| 13849 Dunn ||  ||  || December 7, 1999 || Socorro || LINEAR || FLO || align=right | 3.2 km || 
|-id=850 bgcolor=#fefefe
| 13850 Erman ||  ||  || December 7, 1999 || Socorro || LINEAR || — || align=right | 3.3 km || 
|-id=851 bgcolor=#d6d6d6
| 13851 ||  || — || December 7, 1999 || Socorro || LINEAR || — || align=right | 23 km || 
|-id=852 bgcolor=#fefefe
| 13852 Ford ||  ||  || December 7, 1999 || Socorro || LINEAR || — || align=right | 3.7 km || 
|-id=853 bgcolor=#fefefe
| 13853 Jenniferfritz ||  ||  || December 7, 1999 || Socorro || LINEAR || NYS || align=right | 6.6 km || 
|-id=854 bgcolor=#fefefe
| 13854 ||  || — || December 10, 1999 || Oizumi || T. Kobayashi || NYSslow || align=right | 7.2 km || 
|-id=855 bgcolor=#fefefe
| 13855 ||  || — || December 11, 1999 || Oizumi || T. Kobayashi || V || align=right | 3.0 km || 
|-id=856 bgcolor=#E9E9E9
| 13856 ||  || — || December 11, 1999 || Oizumi || T. Kobayashi || ADE || align=right | 15 km || 
|-id=857 bgcolor=#E9E9E9
| 13857 Stafford ||  ||  || December 4, 1999 || Catalina || CSS || — || align=right | 3.8 km || 
|-id=858 bgcolor=#fefefe
| 13858 Ericchristensen ||  ||  || December 5, 1999 || Catalina || CSS || — || align=right | 3.1 km || 
|-id=859 bgcolor=#E9E9E9
| 13859 Fredtreasure ||  ||  || December 13, 1999 || Fountain Hills || C. W. Juels || — || align=right | 15 km || 
|-id=860 bgcolor=#d6d6d6
| 13860 Neely ||  ||  || December 15, 1999 || Fountain Hills || C. W. Juels || MEL || align=right | 26 km || 
|-id=861 bgcolor=#d6d6d6
| 13861 ||  || — || December 8, 1999 || Socorro || LINEAR || — || align=right | 7.6 km || 
|-id=862 bgcolor=#C2FFFF
| 13862 Elais ||  ||  || December 8, 1999 || Socorro || LINEAR || L4ERY || align=right | 25 km || 
|-id=863 bgcolor=#E9E9E9
| 13863 ||  || — || December 10, 1999 || Socorro || LINEAR || — || align=right | 9.3 km || 
|-id=864 bgcolor=#fefefe
| 13864 ||  || — || December 10, 1999 || Socorro || LINEAR || FLO || align=right | 4.6 km || 
|-id=865 bgcolor=#E9E9E9
| 13865 ||  || — || December 10, 1999 || Socorro || LINEAR || VIB || align=right | 8.5 km || 
|-id=866 bgcolor=#fefefe
| 13866 ||  || — || December 10, 1999 || Socorro || LINEAR || — || align=right | 4.6 km || 
|-id=867 bgcolor=#d6d6d6
| 13867 ||  || — || December 12, 1999 || Socorro || LINEAR || — || align=right | 5.8 km || 
|-id=868 bgcolor=#E9E9E9
| 13868 Catalonia ||  ||  || December 29, 1999 || Piera || J. Guarro i Fló || — || align=right | 3.1 km || 
|-id=869 bgcolor=#E9E9E9
| 13869 Fruge ||  ||  || January 8, 2000 || Socorro || LINEAR || — || align=right | 3.6 km || 
|-id=870 bgcolor=#fefefe
| 13870 || 2158 P-L || — || September 24, 1960 || Palomar || PLS || V || align=right | 2.3 km || 
|-id=871 bgcolor=#fefefe
| 13871 || 2635 P-L || — || September 24, 1960 || Palomar || PLS || — || align=right | 6.1 km || 
|-id=872 bgcolor=#E9E9E9
| 13872 || 2649 P-L || — || September 24, 1960 || Palomar || PLS || — || align=right | 4.8 km || 
|-id=873 bgcolor=#fefefe
| 13873 || 2657 P-L || — || September 24, 1960 || Palomar || PLS || — || align=right | 7.1 km || 
|-id=874 bgcolor=#d6d6d6
| 13874 || 3013 P-L || — || September 24, 1960 || Palomar || PLS || — || align=right | 12 km || 
|-id=875 bgcolor=#d6d6d6
| 13875 || 4525 P-L || — || September 24, 1960 || Palomar || PLS || THM || align=right | 8.2 km || 
|-id=876 bgcolor=#fefefe
| 13876 || 4625 P-L || — || September 24, 1960 || Palomar || PLS || — || align=right | 4.3 km || 
|-id=877 bgcolor=#fefefe
| 13877 || 6063 P-L || — || September 24, 1960 || Palomar || PLS || — || align=right | 2.2 km || 
|-id=878 bgcolor=#E9E9E9
| 13878 || 6106 P-L || — || September 24, 1960 || Palomar || PLS || — || align=right | 3.9 km || 
|-id=879 bgcolor=#E9E9E9
| 13879 || 6328 P-L || — || September 24, 1960 || Palomar || PLS || — || align=right | 3.2 km || 
|-id=880 bgcolor=#fefefe
| 13880 Wayneclark || 6607 P-L ||  || September 24, 1960 || Palomar || PLS || — || align=right | 4.5 km || 
|-id=881 bgcolor=#fefefe
| 13881 || 6625 P-L || — || September 24, 1960 || Palomar || PLS || — || align=right | 2.4 km || 
|-id=882 bgcolor=#fefefe
| 13882 || 6637 P-L || — || September 24, 1960 || Palomar || PLS || FLO || align=right | 2.1 km || 
|-id=883 bgcolor=#d6d6d6
| 13883 || 7066 P-L || — || October 17, 1960 || Palomar || PLS || — || align=right | 11 km || 
|-id=884 bgcolor=#fefefe
| 13884 || 1064 T-1 || — || March 25, 1971 || Palomar || PLS || FLO || align=right | 1.6 km || 
|-id=885 bgcolor=#fefefe
| 13885 || 2104 T-1 || — || March 25, 1971 || Palomar || PLS || NYS || align=right | 2.3 km || 
|-id=886 bgcolor=#d6d6d6
| 13886 || 2312 T-1 || — || March 25, 1971 || Palomar || PLS || KOR || align=right | 5.3 km || 
|-id=887 bgcolor=#E9E9E9
| 13887 || 3041 T-1 || — || March 26, 1971 || Palomar || PLS || — || align=right | 5.4 km || 
|-id=888 bgcolor=#fefefe
| 13888 || 3290 T-1 || — || March 26, 1971 || Palomar || PLS || V || align=right | 2.4 km || 
|-id=889 bgcolor=#fefefe
| 13889 || 4206 T-1 || — || March 26, 1971 || Palomar || PLS || — || align=right | 3.1 km || 
|-id=890 bgcolor=#d6d6d6
| 13890 || 1186 T-2 || — || September 29, 1973 || Palomar || PLS || 7:4 || align=right | 12 km || 
|-id=891 bgcolor=#d6d6d6
| 13891 || 1237 T-2 || — || September 29, 1973 || Palomar || PLS || KOR || align=right | 3.4 km || 
|-id=892 bgcolor=#fefefe
| 13892 || 1266 T-2 || — || September 29, 1973 || Palomar || PLS || — || align=right | 3.7 km || 
|-id=893 bgcolor=#E9E9E9
| 13893 || 1296 T-2 || — || September 29, 1973 || Palomar || PLS || — || align=right | 2.9 km || 
|-id=894 bgcolor=#fefefe
| 13894 || 2039 T-2 || — || September 29, 1973 || Palomar || PLS || V || align=right | 3.3 km || 
|-id=895 bgcolor=#d6d6d6
| 13895 Letkasagjonica || 2168 T-2 ||  || September 29, 1973 || Palomar || PLS || KOR || align=right | 4.0 km || 
|-id=896 bgcolor=#fefefe
| 13896 || 3310 T-2 || — || September 30, 1973 || Palomar || PLS || — || align=right | 2.5 km || 
|-id=897 bgcolor=#d6d6d6
| 13897 Vesuvius || 4216 T-2 ||  || September 29, 1973 || Palomar || PLS || HIL3:2 || align=right | 15 km || 
|-id=898 bgcolor=#fefefe
| 13898 || 4834 T-2 || — || September 25, 1973 || Palomar || PLS || FLO || align=right | 3.1 km || 
|-id=899 bgcolor=#E9E9E9
| 13899 || 5036 T-2 || — || September 25, 1973 || Palomar || PLS || — || align=right | 4.3 km || 
|-id=900 bgcolor=#d6d6d6
| 13900 || 5211 T-2 || — || September 25, 1973 || Palomar || PLS || — || align=right | 6.7 km || 
|}

13901–14000 

|-bgcolor=#d6d6d6
| 13901 || 1140 T-3 || — || October 17, 1977 || Palomar || PLS || — || align=right | 6.3 km || 
|-id=902 bgcolor=#E9E9E9
| 13902 || 4205 T-3 || — || October 16, 1977 || Palomar || PLS || — || align=right | 4.4 km || 
|-id=903 bgcolor=#E9E9E9
| 13903 || 1975 ST || — || September 30, 1975 || Palomar || S. J. Bus || — || align=right | 8.8 km || 
|-id=904 bgcolor=#E9E9E9
| 13904 Univinnitsa ||  ||  || October 3, 1975 || Nauchnij || L. I. Chernykh || — || align=right | 10 km || 
|-id=905 bgcolor=#fefefe
| 13905 || 1976 QA || — || August 27, 1976 || Palomar || S. J. Bus || — || align=right | 8.0 km || 
|-id=906 bgcolor=#fefefe
| 13906 Shunda ||  ||  || August 20, 1977 || Nauchnij || N. S. Chernykh || FLO || align=right | 2.8 km || 
|-id=907 bgcolor=#d6d6d6
| 13907 ||  || — || September 9, 1977 || Palomar || C. M. Olmstead || — || align=right | 5.2 km || 
|-id=908 bgcolor=#fefefe
| 13908 Wölbern ||  ||  || September 2, 1978 || La Silla || C.-I. Lagerkvist || — || align=right | 1.9 km || 
|-id=909 bgcolor=#fefefe
| 13909 ||  || — || November 7, 1978 || Palomar || E. F. Helin, S. J. Bus || — || align=right | 2.1 km || 
|-id=910 bgcolor=#fefefe
| 13910 ||  || — || June 25, 1979 || Siding Spring || E. F. Helin, S. J. Bus || — || align=right | 2.7 km || 
|-id=911 bgcolor=#fefefe
| 13911 Stempels ||  ||  || August 22, 1979 || La Silla || C.-I. Lagerkvist || — || align=right | 3.2 km || 
|-id=912 bgcolor=#fefefe
| 13912 Gammelgarn ||  ||  || August 22, 1979 || La Silla || C.-I. Lagerkvist || MAS || align=right | 3.7 km || 
|-id=913 bgcolor=#E9E9E9
| 13913 || 1979 SO || — || September 25, 1979 || Kleť || A. Mrkos || DOR || align=right | 12 km || 
|-id=914 bgcolor=#E9E9E9
| 13914 Galegant ||  ||  || June 11, 1980 || Palomar || C. S. Shoemaker || — || align=right | 12 km || 
|-id=915 bgcolor=#E9E9E9
| 13915 Yalow ||  ||  || May 27, 1982 || Palomar || C. S. Shoemaker, S. J. Bus || — || align=right | 15 km || 
|-id=916 bgcolor=#fefefe
| 13916 Bernolák ||  ||  || August 23, 1982 || Piszkéstető || M. Antal || — || align=right | 3.3 km || 
|-id=917 bgcolor=#d6d6d6
| 13917 Correggia || 1984 EQ ||  || March 6, 1984 || Anderson Mesa || E. Bowell || INA || align=right | 13 km || 
|-id=918 bgcolor=#E9E9E9
| 13918 Tsukinada || 1984 QB ||  || August 24, 1984 || Geisei || T. Seki || — || align=right | 7.0 km || 
|-id=919 bgcolor=#fefefe
| 13919 ||  || — || September 21, 1984 || La Silla || H. Debehogne || — || align=right | 4.5 km || 
|-id=920 bgcolor=#FA8072
| 13920 Montecorvino ||  ||  || August 15, 1985 || Anderson Mesa || E. Bowell || moon || align=right | 3.4 km || 
|-id=921 bgcolor=#fefefe
| 13921 Sgarbini || 1985 RP ||  || September 14, 1985 || Anderson Mesa || E. Bowell || — || align=right | 4.4 km || 
|-id=922 bgcolor=#E9E9E9
| 13922 Kremenia ||  ||  || September 19, 1985 || Nauchnij || N. S. Chernykh, L. I. Chernykh || — || align=right | 5.3 km || 
|-id=923 bgcolor=#E9E9E9
| 13923 Peterhof ||  ||  || October 22, 1985 || Nauchnij || L. V. Zhuravleva || — || align=right | 9.1 km || 
|-id=924 bgcolor=#fefefe
| 13924 ||  || — || August 1, 1986 || Palomar || E. F. Helin || — || align=right | 4.5 km || 
|-id=925 bgcolor=#d6d6d6
| 13925 ||  || — || August 29, 1986 || La Silla || H. Debehogne || EOS || align=right | 9.2 km || 
|-id=926 bgcolor=#E9E9E9
| 13926 Berners-Lee || 1986 XT ||  || December 2, 1986 || Anderson Mesa || E. Bowell || — || align=right | 2.9 km || 
|-id=927 bgcolor=#fefefe
| 13927 Grundy ||  ||  || September 26, 1987 || Anderson Mesa || E. Bowell || — || align=right | 3.7 km || 
|-id=928 bgcolor=#fefefe
| 13928 Aaronrogers || 1987 UT ||  || October 26, 1987 || Anderson Mesa || E. Bowell || ERI || align=right | 6.4 km || 
|-id=929 bgcolor=#fefefe
| 13929 || 1988 PL || — || August 13, 1988 || Siding Spring || R. H. McNaught || — || align=right | 2.5 km || 
|-id=930 bgcolor=#fefefe
| 13930 Tashko ||  ||  || September 12, 1988 || Smolyan || V. G. Ivanova || — || align=right | 3.1 km || 
|-id=931 bgcolor=#E9E9E9
| 13931 ||  || — || September 14, 1988 || Cerro Tololo || S. J. Bus || — || align=right | 10 km || 
|-id=932 bgcolor=#fefefe
| 13932 Rupprecht ||  ||  || September 18, 1988 || La Silla || ESO || — || align=right | 1.8 km || 
|-id=933 bgcolor=#E9E9E9
| 13933 Charleville ||  ||  || November 2, 1988 || Geisei || T. Seki || — || align=right | 11 km || 
|-id=934 bgcolor=#fefefe
| 13934 Kannami ||  ||  || December 11, 1988 || Gekko || Y. Oshima || — || align=right | 4.7 km || 
|-id=935 bgcolor=#d6d6d6
| 13935 || 1989 EE || — || March 4, 1989 || Palomar || E. F. Helin || EUP || align=right | 9.7 km || 
|-id=936 bgcolor=#d6d6d6
| 13936 || 1989 HC || — || April 30, 1989 || Palomar || E. F. Helin || ALA || align=right | 20 km || 
|-id=937 bgcolor=#E9E9E9
| 13937 Roberthargraves || 1989 PU ||  || August 2, 1989 || Palomar || C. S. Shoemaker, E. M. Shoemaker || — || align=right | 4.9 km || 
|-id=938 bgcolor=#E9E9E9
| 13938 ||  || — || September 5, 1989 || Palomar || E. F. Helin || — || align=right | 7.9 km || 
|-id=939 bgcolor=#E9E9E9
| 13939 ||  || — || September 26, 1989 || La Silla || E. W. Elst || — || align=right | 4.3 km || 
|-id=940 bgcolor=#E9E9E9
| 13940 ||  || — || September 26, 1989 || La Silla || E. W. Elst || — || align=right | 4.3 km || 
|-id=941 bgcolor=#E9E9E9
| 13941 ||  || — || October 2, 1989 || La Silla || H. Debehogne || — || align=right | 4.2 km || 
|-id=942 bgcolor=#E9E9E9
| 13942 Shiratakihime ||  ||  || November 2, 1989 || Kitami || K. Endate, K. Watanabe || — || align=right | 7.0 km || 
|-id=943 bgcolor=#fefefe
| 13943 || 1990 HG || — || April 26, 1990 || Palomar || E. F. Helin || — || align=right | 4.2 km || 
|-id=944 bgcolor=#fefefe
| 13944 ||  || — || July 29, 1990 || Palomar || H. E. Holt || — || align=right | 4.8 km || 
|-id=945 bgcolor=#d6d6d6
| 13945 ||  || — || July 29, 1990 || Palomar || H. E. Holt || — || align=right | 17 km || 
|-id=946 bgcolor=#fefefe
| 13946 ||  || — || July 27, 1990 || Palomar || H. E. Holt || NYS || align=right | 3.3 km || 
|-id=947 bgcolor=#fefefe
| 13947 ||  || — || August 24, 1990 || Palomar || H. E. Holt || — || align=right | 4.6 km || 
|-id=948 bgcolor=#fefefe
| 13948 ||  || — || August 24, 1990 || Palomar || H. E. Holt || — || align=right | 10 km || 
|-id=949 bgcolor=#fefefe
| 13949 ||  || — || September 14, 1990 || Palomar || H. E. Holt || — || align=right | 4.4 km || 
|-id=950 bgcolor=#fefefe
| 13950 ||  || — || September 14, 1990 || Palomar || H. E. Holt || V || align=right | 3.5 km || 
|-id=951 bgcolor=#fefefe
| 13951 ||  || — || September 22, 1990 || La Silla || E. W. Elst || NYS || align=right | 3.1 km || 
|-id=952 bgcolor=#fefefe
| 13952 Nykvist ||  ||  || September 22, 1990 || La Silla || E. W. Elst || — || align=right | 6.3 km || 
|-id=953 bgcolor=#E9E9E9
| 13953 ||  || — || October 9, 1990 || Siding Spring || R. H. McNaught || — || align=right | 4.6 km || 
|-id=954 bgcolor=#E9E9E9
| 13954 Born ||  ||  || October 13, 1990 || Tautenburg Observatory || F. Börngen, L. D. Schmadel || — || align=right | 5.8 km || 
|-id=955 bgcolor=#E9E9E9
| 13955 ||  || — || October 21, 1990 || Oohira || T. Urata || — || align=right | 2.5 km || 
|-id=956 bgcolor=#E9E9E9
| 13956 Banks ||  ||  || November 15, 1990 || La Silla || E. W. Elst || — || align=right | 6.3 km || 
|-id=957 bgcolor=#E9E9E9
| 13957 NARIT ||  ||  || January 7, 1991 || Siding Spring || R. H. McNaught || — || align=right | 8.5 km || 
|-id=958 bgcolor=#E9E9E9
| 13958 || 1991 DY || — || February 19, 1991 || Palomar || E. F. Helin || — || align=right | 9.4 km || 
|-id=959 bgcolor=#E9E9E9
| 13959 ||  || — || March 12, 1991 || La Silla || H. Debehogne || EUN || align=right | 6.5 km || 
|-id=960 bgcolor=#E9E9E9
| 13960 ||  || — || April 8, 1991 || La Silla || E. W. Elst || GEF || align=right | 5.0 km || 
|-id=961 bgcolor=#fefefe
| 13961 || 1991 PV || — || August 5, 1991 || Palomar || H. E. Holt || — || align=right | 2.3 km || 
|-id=962 bgcolor=#d6d6d6
| 13962 Delambre ||  ||  || August 3, 1991 || La Silla || E. W. Elst || THM || align=right | 12 km || 
|-id=963 bgcolor=#d6d6d6
| 13963 Euphrates ||  ||  || August 3, 1991 || La Silla || E. W. Elst || 2:1J || align=right | 9.3 km || 
|-id=964 bgcolor=#d6d6d6
| 13964 La Billardière ||  ||  || August 3, 1991 || La Silla || E. W. Elst || THM || align=right | 11 km || 
|-id=965 bgcolor=#d6d6d6
| 13965 ||  || — || August 5, 1991 || Palomar || H. E. Holt || THM || align=right | 7.8 km || 
|-id=966 bgcolor=#fefefe
| 13966 ||  || — || August 7, 1991 || Palomar || H. E. Holt || — || align=right | 2.8 km || 
|-id=967 bgcolor=#fefefe
| 13967 || 1991 QJ || — || August 31, 1991 || Kiyosato || S. Otomo || FLO || align=right | 3.0 km || 
|-id=968 bgcolor=#d6d6d6
| 13968 ||  || — || September 2, 1991 || Siding Spring || R. H. McNaught || — || align=right | 18 km || 
|-id=969 bgcolor=#fefefe
| 13969 ||  || — || September 11, 1991 || Palomar || H. E. Holt || FLO || align=right | 2.8 km || 
|-id=970 bgcolor=#fefefe
| 13970 ||  || — || September 13, 1991 || Palomar || H. E. Holt || FLO || align=right | 3.1 km || 
|-id=971 bgcolor=#fefefe
| 13971 ||  || — || October 18, 1991 || Kushiro || S. Ueda, H. Kaneda || NYS || align=right | 2.3 km || 
|-id=972 bgcolor=#fefefe
| 13972 ||  || — || October 31, 1991 || Kushiro || S. Ueda, H. Kaneda || — || align=right | 3.8 km || 
|-id=973 bgcolor=#fefefe
| 13973 ||  || — || October 31, 1991 || Kushiro || S. Ueda, H. Kaneda || MAS || align=right | 2.2 km || 
|-id=974 bgcolor=#E9E9E9
| 13974 || 1991 YC || — || December 28, 1991 || Yakiimo || A. Natori, T. Urata || — || align=right | 5.2 km || 
|-id=975 bgcolor=#fefefe
| 13975 Beatrixpotter ||  ||  || January 30, 1992 || La Silla || E. W. Elst || V || align=right | 2.7 km || 
|-id=976 bgcolor=#E9E9E9
| 13976 ||  || — || March 1, 1992 || La Silla || UESAC || — || align=right | 3.6 km || 
|-id=977 bgcolor=#fefefe
| 13977 Frisch ||  ||  || April 29, 1992 || Tautenburg Observatory || F. Börngen || SVE || align=right | 9.3 km || 
|-id=978 bgcolor=#E9E9E9
| 13978 Hiwasa || 1992 JQ ||  || May 4, 1992 || Geisei || T. Seki || — || align=right | 6.0 km || 
|-id=979 bgcolor=#E9E9E9
| 13979 ||  || — || May 8, 1992 || La Silla || H. Debehogne || — || align=right | 11 km || 
|-id=980 bgcolor=#E9E9E9
| 13980 Neuhauser || 1992 NS ||  || July 2, 1992 || Palomar || E. F. Helin || ADE || align=right | 10 km || 
|-id=981 bgcolor=#E9E9E9
| 13981 ||  || — || July 28, 1992 || La Silla || H. Debehogne, Á. López-G. || — || align=right | 5.9 km || 
|-id=982 bgcolor=#d6d6d6
| 13982 Thunberg ||  ||  || September 2, 1992 || La Silla || E. W. Elst || — || align=right | 5.7 km || 
|-id=983 bgcolor=#d6d6d6
| 13983 ||  || — || September 2, 1992 || La Silla || E. W. Elst || — || align=right | 11 km || 
|-id=984 bgcolor=#d6d6d6
| 13984 ||  || — || September 2, 1992 || La Silla || E. W. Elst || THM || align=right | 8.0 km || 
|-id=985 bgcolor=#fefefe
| 13985 ||  || — || October 22, 1992 || Kushiro || S. Ueda, H. Kaneda || — || align=right | 3.1 km || 
|-id=986 bgcolor=#d6d6d6
| 13986 ||  || — || November 21, 1992 || Kushiro || S. Ueda, H. Kaneda || HYG || align=right | 12 km || 
|-id=987 bgcolor=#d6d6d6
| 13987 ||  || — || November 16, 1992 || Kushiro || S. Ueda, H. Kaneda || — || align=right | 8.5 km || 
|-id=988 bgcolor=#fefefe
| 13988 ||  || — || December 18, 1992 || Caussols || E. W. Elst || FLO || align=right | 2.5 km || 
|-id=989 bgcolor=#fefefe
| 13989 Murikabushi || 1993 BG ||  || January 16, 1993 || Geisei || T. Seki || — || align=right | 5.0 km || 
|-id=990 bgcolor=#fefefe
| 13990 || 1993 EK || — || March 2, 1993 || Oohira || T. Urata || — || align=right | 2.7 km || 
|-id=991 bgcolor=#fefefe
| 13991 Kenphillips ||  ||  || March 17, 1993 || La Silla || UESAC || NYS || align=right | 2.5 km || 
|-id=992 bgcolor=#fefefe
| 13992 Cesarebarbieri ||  ||  || March 17, 1993 || La Silla || UESAC || V || align=right | 3.3 km || 
|-id=993 bgcolor=#fefefe
| 13993 Clemenssimmer ||  ||  || March 17, 1993 || La Silla || UESAC || — || align=right | 2.7 km || 
|-id=994 bgcolor=#fefefe
| 13994 Tuominen ||  ||  || March 17, 1993 || La Silla || UESAC || V || align=right | 2.7 km || 
|-id=995 bgcolor=#fefefe
| 13995 Tõravere ||  ||  || March 19, 1993 || La Silla || UESAC || MAS || align=right | 2.7 km || 
|-id=996 bgcolor=#fefefe
| 13996 ||  || — || March 19, 1993 || La Silla || UESAC || NYS || align=right | 2.1 km || 
|-id=997 bgcolor=#fefefe
| 13997 ||  || — || March 19, 1993 || La Silla || UESAC || — || align=right | 6.1 km || 
|-id=998 bgcolor=#fefefe
| 13998 ||  || — || March 19, 1993 || La Silla || UESAC || NYS || align=right | 2.1 km || 
|-id=999 bgcolor=#fefefe
| 13999 ||  || — || March 19, 1993 || La Silla || UESAC || — || align=right | 3.2 km || 
|-id=000 bgcolor=#fefefe
| 14000 ||  || — || March 17, 1993 || La Silla || UESAC || ERI || align=right | 8.9 km || 
|}

References

External links 
 Discovery Circumstances: Numbered Minor Planets (10001)–(15000) (IAU Minor Planet Center)

0013